= Katakana (Unicode block) =

- Range: U+30A0..U+30FF (96 code points)
- Plane: BMP
- Scripts: Katakana (93 char.); Common (3 char.)
- Major alphabets: Japanese; Ainu
- Assigned: 96 code points
- Unused: 0 reserved code points
- Source standards: JIS X 0208

Unicode Version History
- 1.0.0 (1991): 90 (+90)
- 1.1 (1993): 94 (+4)
- 3.2 (2002): 96 (+2)

Unicode documentation
- Code chart ∣ Web page

Katakana is a Unicode block containing katakana characters for the Japanese and Ainu languages.

== Block ==
Katakana^{[1]} Official Unicode Consortium code chart (PDF)
	0	1	2	3	4	5	6	7	8	9	A	B	C	D	E	F
U+30Ax	゠	ァ	ア	ィ	イ	ゥ	ウ	ェ	エ	ォ	オ	カ	ガ	キ	ギ	ク
U+30Bx	グ	ケ	ゲ	コ	ゴ	サ	ザ	シ	ジ	ス	ズ	セ	ゼ	ソ	ゾ	タ
U+30Cx	ダ	チ	ヂ	ッ	ツ	ヅ	テ	デ	ト	ド	ナ	ニ	ヌ	ネ	ノ	ハ
U+30Dx	バ	パ	ヒ	ビ	ピ	フ	ブ	プ	ヘ	ベ	ペ	ホ	ボ	ポ	マ	ミ
U+30Ex	ム	メ	モ	ャ	ヤ	ュ	ユ	ョ	ヨ	ラ	リ	ル	レ	ロ	ヮ	ワ
U+30Fx	ヰ	ヱ	ヲ	ン	ヴ	ヵ	ヶ	ヷ	ヸ	ヹ	ヺ	・	ー	ヽ	ヾ	ヿ
Notes 1.As of Unicode version 17.0

== History ==
The following Unicode-related documents record the purpose and process of defining specific characters in the Katakana block:

Version	Final code points (Note: Proposed code points and characters names may differ from final code points and names)	Count	L2 ID	WG2 ID	Document
1.0.0	U+30A1..30F6, 30FB..30FE	90			(to be determined)
1.1	U+30F7..30FA	4			(to be determined)
3.2	U+30A0, 30FF	2	L2/99-238		Consolidated document containing 6 Japanese proposals, 1999-07-15
3.2	U+30A0, 30FF	2		N2092	Addition of forty eight characters, 1999-09-13
3.2	U+30A0, 30FF	2	L2/00-024		Shibano, Kohji (2000-01-31), JCS proposal revised
3.2	U+30A0, 30FF	2	L2/00-098, L2/00-098-page5	N2195	Rationale for non-Kanji characters proposed by JCS committee, 2000-03-15
3.2	U+30A0, 30FF	2	L2/00-234	N2203 (rtf, txt)	Umamaheswaran, V. S. (2000-07-21), "8.20", Minutes from the SC2/WG2 meeting in Beijing, 2000-03-21 -- 24
3.2	U+30A0, 30FF	2	L2/00-298	N2258	Sato, T. K. (2000-09-04), JIS X 0213 symbols part-2
3.2	U+30A0, 30FF	2	L2/00-342	N2278	Sato, T. K.; Everson, Michael; Whistler, Ken; Freytag, Asmus (2000-09-20), Ad hoc Report on Japan feedback N2257 and N2258
3.2	U+30A0, 30FF	2	L2/01-050	N2253	Umamaheswaran, V. S. (2001-01-21), "7.16 JIS X0213 Symbols", Minutes of the SC2/WG2 meeting in Athens, September 2000
3.2	U+30A0, 30FF	2	L2/01-114	N2328	Summary of Voting on SC 2 N 3503, ISO/IEC 10646-1: 2000/PDAM 1, 2001-03-09

== See also ==
- Katakana Phonetic Extensions (Unicode block)
- Kana Extended-A (Unicode block) has eight katakana characters: U+1B120–U+1B122 and U+1B124–U+1B128
- Kana Extended-B (Unicode block)
- Kana Supplement (Unicode block)
- Small Kana Extension (Unicode block) has six katakana characters: U+1B155 and U+1B164–U+1B168
- Hiragana (Unicode block)
- CJK Compatibility (Unicode block)
- Enclosed CJK Letters and Months (Unicode block)
- Halfwidth and Fullwidth Forms (Unicode block)
