= A (kana) =

a

Hiragana	Katakana
- Transliteration: a
- Hiragana origin: 安
- Katakana origin: 阿
- Man'yōgana: 阿 安 英 足 鞅
- Spelling kana: 朝のア (Asahi no "a")

A (hiragana: あ, katakana: ア) is a Japanese kana that represents the mora consisting of single vowel [a]. The hiragana character あ is based on the sōsho style of kanji 安, while the katakana ア is from the radical of kanji 阿. In the modern Japanese system of alphabetical order, it occupies the first position of the alphabet, before い. Additionally, it is the 36th letter in Iroha, after て, before さ. The Unicode for あ is U+3042, and the Unicode for ア is U+30A2.

Form	Rōmaji	Hiragana	Katakana
Normal a/i/u/e/o (あ行 a-gyō)	a	あ	ア
Normal a/i/u/e/o (あ行 a-gyō)	aa ā	ああ, あぁ あー	アア, アァ アー

== Derivation ==
The katakana ア derives, via man'yōgana, from the left element of kanji 阿. The hiragana あ derives from cursive simplification of the kanji 安.

== Variant forms ==
Scaled-down versions of the kana (ぁ, ァ) are used to express sounds foreign to the Japanese language, such as ファ (fa). In some Okinawan writing systems, a small ぁ is also combined with the kana く (ku) and ふ (fu or hu) to form the digraphs くぁ (kwa) and ふぁ (hwa), although others use a small ゎ instead. In hentaigana, a variant of あ is appeared with a stroke written exactly as wakanmuri. The version of the kana with dakuten (あ゙, ア゙) are used to represent either a gurgling sound, a voiced pharyngeal fricative (/ʕ/), or other similarly articulated sound.

== Stroke order ==
Stroke order in writing あ

Stroke order in writing ア

Stroke order in writing あ

The hiragana あ is made with three strokes:

1. At the top, a horizontal stroke from left to right.
2. A downward vertical stroke starting above and in the center of the last stroke.
3. At the bottom, a loop like the hiragana の.

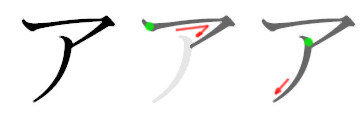
Stroke order in writing ア

The katakana ア is made with two strokes:

1. At the top, a stroke consisting of a horizontal line and a short horizontal line proceeding downward and to the left.
2. Starting at the end of the last stroke, a curved line proceeding downward and to the left.

== Other communicative representations ==
Japanese radiotelephony alphabet	Wabun code
朝日のア; Asahi no "A"	▄▄▄ ▄▄▄ ▄ ▄▄▄ ▄▄▄

Japanese Navy Signal Flag

Japanese semaphore
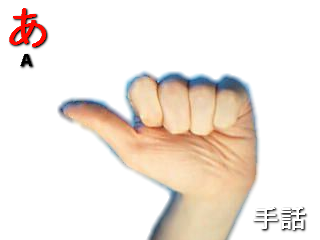
Japanese manual syllabary (fingerspelling)
Braille dots-1
Japanese Braille

=== Braille forms ===
あ / ア in Japanese Braille
あ / ア a	ああ / アー ā	+あ / +ー chōon*
⠁ (braille pattern dots-1)	⠁ (braille pattern dots-1) ⠒ (braille pattern dots-25)	⠒ (braille pattern dots-25)

* When lengthening "-a" morae in Japanese braille, a chōon is always used, as in standard katakana usage instead of adding an あ / ア.

=== Computer encodings ===
Character information
Preview	あ		ア		ｱ		㋐	
Unicode name	HIRAGANA LETTER A		KATAKANA LETTER A		HALFWIDTH KATAKANA LETTER A		CIRCLED KATAKANA A	
Encodings	decimal	hex	dec	hex	dec	hex	dec	hex
Unicode	12354	U+3042	12450	U+30A2	65393	U+FF71	13008	U+32D0
UTF-8	227 129 130	E3 81 82	227 130 162	E3 82 A2	239 189 177	EF BD B1	227 139 144	E3 8B 90
Numeric character reference	&#12354;	&#x3042;	&#12450;	&#x30A2;	&#65393;	&#xFF71;	&#13008;	&#x32D0;
Shift JIS	130 160	82 A0	131 65	83 41	177	B1		
EUC-JP	164 162	A4 A2	165 162	A5 A2	142 177	8E B1		
GB 18030	164 162	A4 A2	165 162	A5 A2	132 49 151 51	84 31 97 33	129 57 209 54	81 39 D1 36
EUC-KR / UHC	170 162	AA A2	171 162	AB A2				
Big5 (non-ETEN kana)	198 166	C6 A6	198 249	C6 F9				
Big5 (ETEN / HKSCS)	198 232	C6 E8	199 124	C7 7C				

Character information
Preview	ぁ		ァ		ｧ	
Unicode name	HIRAGANA LETTER SMALL A		KATAKANA LETTER SMALL A		HALFWIDTH KATAKANA LETTER SMALL A	
Encodings	decimal	hex	dec	hex	dec	hex
Unicode	12353	U+3041	12449	U+30A1	65383	U+FF67
UTF-8	227 129 129	E3 81 81	227 130 161	E3 82 A1	239 189 167	EF BD A7
Numeric character reference	&#12353;	&#x3041;	&#12449;	&#x30A1;	&#65383;	&#xFF67;
Shift JIS	130 159	82 9F	131 64	83 40	167	A7
EUC-JP	164 161	A4 A1	165 161	A5 A1	142 167	8E A7
GB 18030	164 161	A4 A1	165 161	A5 A1	132 49 150 51	84 31 96 33
EUC-KR / UHC	170 161	AA A1	171 161	AB A1		
Big5 (non-ETEN kana)	198 165	C6 A5	198 248	C6 F8		
Big5 (ETEN / HKSCS)	198 231	C6 E7	199 123	C7 7B		
