= He (kana) =

he

Hiragana	Katakana
- Transliteration: he
- Translit. with dakuten: be
- Translit. with handakuten: pe
- Hiragana origin: 部
- Katakana origin: 部
- Man'yōgana: 平 反 返 弁 弊 陛 遍 覇 部 辺 重 隔 閉 倍 陪 拝 戸 経
- Voiced man'yōgana: 弁 便 別 部 倍 毎
- Spelling kana: 平和のヘ Heiwa no "he"
- Unicode: U+3078, U+30D8
- Braille: ⠯
- Note: This mora was historically pronounced as "pe", with one of two different vowel sounds, which later merged.

He (hiragana: へ, katakana: ヘ) is one of the Japanese kana, which represents one mora. The [he] sound is the only sound that is written almost identically in hiragana and katakana and therefore confusable according to the Unicode Standard. In the Sakhalin dialect of the Ainu language, ヘ can be written as small ㇸ to represent a final [h] after an [e] sound (エㇸ [eh]).

It is usually pronounced [he] with the aspirate [h] before its vowel. It is also often used as a grammatical particle indicating direction, which makes only the vowel sound [e]; when used this way, it is sometimes romanised as 'e.

Though the two forms へ and ヘ are usually rendered with a small difference between them, in order to match better with the appearance of other hiragana or katakana characters, they can often be rendered identically. A reader is not expected to distinguish one from the other without contextual clues.

Forms	Rōmaji	Hiragana	Katakana	Example words (with kanji)
Normal h- (は行 ha-gyō)	he	へ	ヘ	へび hebi 蛇 snake; へる heru 減る abate/decrease; へんか henka 変化 change/modification; へい hei 塀 wall; へいあん heian 平安 tranquility
Normal h- (は行 ha-gyō)	hei hee hē	へい, へぃ へえ, へぇ へー	ヘイ, ヘィ ヘエ, ヘェ ヘー	へび hebi 蛇 snake; へる heru 減る abate/decrease; へんか henka 変化 change/modification; へい hei 塀 wall; へいあん heian 平安 tranquility
Addition dakuten b- (ば行 ba-gyō)	be	べ	ベ	かべ kabe 壁 wall; べんきょう benkyō 勉強 studying; ベッド beddo bed; なんべい nanbei 南米 South America
Addition dakuten b- (ば行 ba-gyō)	bei bee bē	べい, べぃ べえ, べぇ べー	ベイ, ベィ ベエ, ベェ ベー	かべ kabe 壁 wall; べんきょう benkyō 勉強 studying; ベッド beddo bed; なんべい nanbei 南米 South America
Addition handakuten p- (ぱ行 pa-gyō)	pe	ぺ	ペ	いっぺん ippen 一辺 on a side; ペルー perū Peru
Addition handakuten p- (ぱ行 pa-gyō)	pei pee pē	ぺい, ぺぃ ぺえ, ぺぇ ぺー	ペイ, ペィ ペエ, ペェ ペー	いっぺん ippen 一辺 on a side; ペルー perū Peru

== Stroke order ==
The stroke order is similar between hiragana and katakana.

Stroke order in writing ヘ

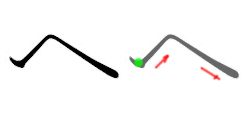
Stroke order in writing ヘ

== Other communicative representations ==
Japanese radiotelephony alphabet	Wabun code
平和のヘ; Heiwa no "He"	▄

Japanese Navy Signal Flag

Japanese semaphore
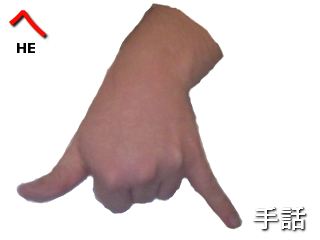
Japanese manual syllabary (fingerspelling)
Braille dots-12346
Japanese Braille

=== Braille forms ===
へ / ヘ in Japanese Braille
へ / ヘ he	べ / ベ be	ぺ / ペ pe	へい / ヘー hē/hei	べい / ベー bē/bei	ぺい / ペー pē/pei
⠯ (braille pattern dots-12346)	⠐ (braille pattern dots-5) ⠯ (braille pattern dots-12346)	⠠ (braille pattern dots-6) ⠯ (braille pattern dots-12346)	⠯ (braille pattern dots-12346) ⠒ (braille pattern dots-25)	⠐ (braille pattern dots-5) ⠯ (braille pattern dots-12346) ⠒ (braille pattern dots-25)	⠠ (braille pattern dots-6) ⠯ (braille pattern dots-12346) ⠒ (braille pattern dots-25)

=== Computer encodings ===
Character information
Preview	へ		ヘ		ﾍ		ㇸ		㋬	
Unicode name	HIRAGANA LETTER HE		KATAKANA LETTER HE		HALFWIDTH KATAKANA LETTER HE		KATAKANA LETTER SMALL HE		CIRCLED KATAKANA HE	
Encodings	decimal	hex	dec	hex	dec	hex	dec	hex	dec	hex
Unicode	12408	U+3078	12504	U+30D8	65421	U+FF8D	12792	U+31F8	13036	U+32EC
UTF-8	227 129 184	E3 81 B8	227 131 152	E3 83 98	239 190 141	EF BE 8D	227 135 184	E3 87 B8	227 139 172	E3 8B AC
Numeric character reference	&#12408;	&#x3078;	&#12504;	&#x30D8;	&#65421;	&#xFF8D;	&#12792;	&#x31F8;	&#13036;	&#x32EC;
Shift JIS (plain)	130 214	82 D6	131 119	83 77	205	CD				
Shift JIS-2004	130 214	82 D6	131 119	83 77	205	CD	131 244	83 F4		
EUC-JP (plain)	164 216	A4 D8	165 216	A5 D8	142 205	8E CD				
EUC-JIS-2004	164 216	A4 D8	165 216	A5 D8	142 205	8E CD	166 246	A6 F6		
GB 18030	164 216	A4 D8	165 216	A5 D8	132 49 154 49	84 31 9A 31	129 57 189 50	81 39 BD 32		
EUC-KR / UHC	170 216	AA D8	171 216	AB D8						
Big5 (non-ETEN kana)	198 220	C6 DC	199 112	C7 70						
Big5 (ETEN / HKSCS)	199 95	C7 5F	199 212	C7 D4						

Character information
Preview	べ		ベ		ぺ		ペ	
Unicode name	HIRAGANA LETTER BE		KATAKANA LETTER BE		HIRAGANA LETTER PE		KATAKANA LETTER PE	
Encodings	decimal	hex	dec	hex	dec	hex	dec	hex
Unicode	12409	U+3079	12505	U+30D9	12410	U+307A	12506	U+30DA
UTF-8	227 129 185	E3 81 B9	227 131 153	E3 83 99	227 129 186	E3 81 BA	227 131 154	E3 83 9A
Numeric character reference	&#12409;	&#x3079;	&#12505;	&#x30D9;	&#12410;	&#x307A;	&#12506;	&#x30DA;
Shift JIS	130 215	82 D7	131 120	83 78	130 216	82 D8	131 121	83 79
EUC-JP	164 217	A4 D9	165 217	A5 D9	164 218	A4 DA	165 218	A5 DA
GB 18030	164 217	A4 D9	165 217	A5 D9	164 218	A4 DA	165 218	A5 DA
EUC-KR / UHC	170 217	AA D9	171 217	AB D9	170 218	AA DA	171 218	AB DA
Big5 (non-ETEN kana)	198 221	C6 DD	199 113	C7 71	198 222	C6 DE	199 114	C7 72
Big5 (ETEN / HKSCS)	199 96	C7 60	199 213	C7 D5	199 97	C7 61	199 214	C7 D6

== See also ==
- Japanese particles: へ
