= Fu (kana) =

fu

Hiragana	Katakana
- Transliteration: fu, hu
- Translit. with dakuten: bu
- Translit. with handakuten: pu
- Hiragana origin: 不
- Katakana origin: 不
- Man'yōgana: 不 否 布 負 部 敷 経 歴
- Voiced man'yōgana: 夫 扶 府 文 柔 歩 部
- Spelling kana: 富士山のフ Fujisan no "fu"
- Unicode: U+3075, U+30D5
- Braille: ⠭
- Note: This mora was historically pronounced as "pu".

Fu (hiragana: ふ, katakana: フ) is one of the Japanese kana, each of which represents one mora. The hiragana is made in four strokes, while the katakana in one. It represents the phoneme /hɯ/, although for phonological reasons (general scheme for /h/ group, whose only phonologic survivor to /f/ ([ɸ]) remaining is ふ: b←p←f→h), the actual pronunciation is [ɸɯᵝ], which is why it is romanized fu in Hepburn romanization instead of hu as in Nihon-shiki and Kunrei-shiki rōmaji (Korean 후 /hu/ creates the same phonetic effect as lips are projected when pronouncing "u"). Written with a dakuten (ぶ, ブ), they both represent a "bu" sound, and written with handakuten (ぷ, プ) they both represent a "pu" sound.

The katakana フ is frequently combined with other vowels to represent sounds in foreign words. For example, the word "file" is written in Japanese as ファイル (fairu), with ファ representing a non-native sound, fa. and in loanwords beginning with the clusters "fl", "fr", "bl", "br", "pl" and "pr". this kana, along with their dakuten and handakuten forms, is often combined with r- kanas.

In certain Okinawan writing systems, ふ/フ can be written as ふぁ, ふぃ, ふぇ to make both fa, fi, and fe sounds as well as representing the sounds hwa, hwi, and hwe. In the Ryukyu University system, fa/hwa is written using the wa kana instead, ふゎ/フヮ. In the Ainu language the katakana with a handakuten プ can be written as a small ㇷ゚ to represent a final p sound. In the Sakhalin dialect, フ without a handakuten can be written as small ㇷ to represent a final h sound after an u sound (ウㇷ uh).

Forms	Rōmaji	Hiragana	Katakana	Example words (with kanji)
Normal f- (は行 ha-gyō)	fu	ふ	フ	ふゆ fuyu 冬 winter; ふえる fueru 増える to grow/increase; ふつう futsū 普通 normal; ふみきり fumikiri 踏み切り level crossing; ふとん futon 布団 quilt/blanket; ふるえる furueru 震える to shake; フランス furansu France
Normal f- (は行 ha-gyō)	fuu, fwu fū	ふう, ふぅ ふー	フウ, フゥ フー	ふゆ fuyu 冬 winter; ふえる fueru 増える to grow/increase; ふつう futsū 普通 normal; ふみきり fumikiri 踏み切り level crossing; ふとん futon 布団 quilt/blanket; ふるえる furueru 震える to shake; フランス furansu France
Addition dakuten b- (ば行 ba-gyō)	bu	ぶ	ブ	はんぶん hanbun 半分 half; かぶ kabu 株 share/stump; ぶし bushi 武士 samurai; ハーブ hābu herb
Addition dakuten b- (ば行 ba-gyō)	buu, bwu bū	ぶう, ぶぅ ぶー	ブウ, ブゥ ブー	はんぶん hanbun 半分 half; かぶ kabu 株 share/stump; ぶし bushi 武士 samurai; ハーブ hābu herb
Addition handakuten p- (ぱ行 pa-gyō)	pu	ぷ	プ	きっぷ kippu 切符 stamp; おんぷ ompu 音符 note
Addition handakuten p- (ぱ行 pa-gyō)	puu, pwu pū	ぷう, ぷぅ ぷー	プウ, プゥ プー	きっぷ kippu 切符 stamp; おんぷ ompu 音符 note

Other additional forms

Form A (f-/fw-/fy-)
Rōmaji	Hiragana	Katakana
fa, fwa	ふぁ, ふゎ	ファ, フヮ	ファール fāru foul
fi, fwi	ふぃ	フィ	フィンランド finrando Finland
(fwu)	(ふぅ)	(フゥ)	フリー furī Free
fe, fwe	ふぇ	フェ	フェルト feruto felt
fo, fwo	ふぉ	フォ	フォード fōdo Ford
fya	ふゃ	フャ
fyu	ふゅ	フュ
fye	ふぃぇ	フィェ
fyo	ふょ	フョ

Form B (bw-)
Rōmaji	Hiragana	Katakana
bwa	ぶぁ, ぶゎ	ブァ, ブヮ
bwi	ぶぃ	ブィ
(bwu)	(ぶぅ)	(ブゥ)
bwe	ぶぇ	ブェ
bwo	ぶぉ	ブォ

Form C (pw-)
Rōmaji	Hiragana	Katakana
pwa	ぷぁ, ぷゎ	プァ, プヮ
pwi	ぷぃ	プィ
(pwu)	(ぷぅ)	(プゥ)
pwe	ぷぇ	プェ
pwo	ぷぉ	プォ

== Stroke order ==
Stroke order in writing ふ

4

Stroke order in writing フ

1

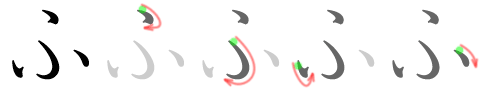
Stroke order in writing ふ

Stroke order in writing フ

== Other communicative representations ==
Japanese radiotelephony alphabet	Wabun code
富士山のフ; Fujisan no "Fu"	▄▄▄ ▄▄▄ ▄ ▄

Japanese Navy Signal Flag

Japanese semaphore
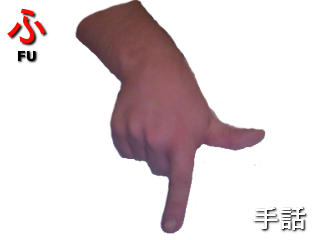
Japanese manual syllabary (fingerspelling)
Braille dots-1346
Japanese Braille

=== Braille forms ===
ふ / フ in Japanese Braille
ふ / フ fu	ぶ / ブ bu	ぷ / プ pu	ふう / フー fū	ぶう / ブー bū	ぷう / プー pū	Other kana based on Braille ふ					
ふ / フ fu	ぶ / ブ bu	ぷ / プ pu	ふう / フー fū	ぶう / ブー bū	ぷう / プー pū	ひゅ / ヒゅ hyu	びゅ / ビュ byu	ぴゅ / ピュ pyu	ひゅう / ヒュー hyū	びゅう / ビュー byū	ぴゅう / ピュー pyū
⠭ (braille pattern dots-1346)	⠐ (braille pattern dots-5) ⠭ (braille pattern dots-1346)	⠠ (braille pattern dots-6) ⠭ (braille pattern dots-1346)	⠭ (braille pattern dots-1346) ⠒ (braille pattern dots-25)	⠐ (braille pattern dots-5) ⠭ (braille pattern dots-1346) ⠒ (braille pattern dots-25)	⠠ (braille pattern dots-6) ⠭ (braille pattern dots-1346) ⠒ (braille pattern dots-25)	⠈ (braille pattern dots-4) ⠭ (braille pattern dots-1346)	⠘ (braille pattern dots-45) ⠭ (braille pattern dots-1346)	⠨ (braille pattern dots-46) ⠭ (braille pattern dots-1346)	⠈ (braille pattern dots-4) ⠭ (braille pattern dots-1346) ⠒ (braille pattern dots-25)	⠘ (braille pattern dots-45) ⠭ (braille pattern dots-1346) ⠒ (braille pattern dots-25)	⠨ (braille pattern dots-46) ⠭ (braille pattern dots-1346) ⠒ (braille pattern dots-25)

=== Computer encodings ===
Character information
Preview	ふ		フ		ﾌ		ㇷ		ぶ	
Unicode name	HIRAGANA LETTER HU		KATAKANA LETTER HU		HALFWIDTH KATAKANA LETTER HU		KATAKANA LETTER SMALL HU		HIRAGANA LETTER BU	
Encodings	decimal	hex	dec	hex	dec	hex	dec	hex	dec	hex
Unicode	12405	U+3075	12501	U+30D5	65420	U+FF8C	12791	U+31F7	12406	U+3076
UTF-8	227 129 181	E3 81 B5	227 131 149	E3 83 95	239 190 140	EF BE 8C	227 135 183	E3 87 B7	227 129 182	E3 81 B6
Numeric character reference	&#12405;	&#x3075;	&#12501;	&#x30D5;	&#65420;	&#xFF8C;	&#12791;	&#x31F7;	&#12406;	&#x3076;
Shift JIS (plain)	130 211	82 D3	131 116	83 74	204	CC			130 212	82 D4
Shift JIS-2004	130 211	82 D3	131 116	83 74	204	CC	131 243	83 F3	130 212	82 D4
EUC-JP (plain)	164 213	A4 D5	165 213	A5 D5	142 204	8E CC			164 214	A4 D6
EUC-JIS-2004	164 213	A4 D5	165 213	A5 D5	142 204	8E CC	166 245	A6 F5	164 214	A4 D6
GB 18030	164 213	A4 D5	165 213	A5 D5	132 49 154 48	84 31 9A 30	129 57 189 49	81 39 BD 31	164 214	A4 D6
EUC-KR / UHC	170 213	AA D5	171 213	AB D5					170 214	AA D6
Big5 (non-ETEN kana)	198 217	C6 D9	199 109	C7 6D					198 218	C6 DA
Big5 (ETEN / HKSCS)	199 92	C7 5C	199 209	C7 D1					199 93	C7 5D

Character information
Preview	ブ		ぷ		プ		ㇷ゚		㋫	
Unicode name	KATAKANA LETTER BU		HIRAGANA LETTER PU		KATAKANA LETTER PU		KATAKANA LETTER AINU P		CIRCLED KATAKANA HU	
Encodings	decimal	hex	dec	hex	dec	hex	dec	hex	dec	hex
Unicode	12502	U+30D6	12407	U+3077	12503	U+30D7	12791 12442	U+31F7+309A	13035	U+32EB
UTF-8	227 131 150	E3 83 96	227 129 183	E3 81 B7	227 131 151	E3 83 97	227 135 183 227 130 154	E3 87 B7 E3 82 9A	227 139 171	E3 8B AB
Numeric character reference	&#12502;	&#x30D6;	&#12407;	&#x3077;	&#12503;	&#x30D7;	&#12791;&#12442;	&#x31F7;&#x309A;	&#13035;	&#x32EB;
Shift JIS (plain)	131 117	83 75	130 213	82 D5	131 118	83 76				
Shift JIS-2004	131 117	83 75	130 213	82 D5	131 118	83 76	131 246	83 F6		
EUC-JP (plain)	165 214	A5 D6	164 215	A4 D7	165 215	A5 D7				
EUC-JIS-2004	165 214	A5 D6	164 215	A4 D7	165 215	A5 D7	166 248	A6 F8		
GB 18030	165 214	A5 D6	164 215	A4 D7	165 215	A5 D7				
EUC-KR / UHC	171 214	AB D6	170 215	AA D7	171 215	AB D7				
Big5 (non-ETEN kana)	199 110	C7 6E	198 219	C6 DB	199 111	C7 6F				
Big5 (ETEN / HKSCS)	199 210	C7 D2	199 94	C7 5E	199 211	C7 D3				
