= Ho (kana) =

ho

Hiragana	Katakana
- Transliteration: ho
- Translit. with dakuten: bo
- Translit. with handakuten: po
- Hiragana origin: 保
- Katakana origin: 保
- Man'yōgana: 凡 方 抱 朋 倍 保 宝 富 百 帆 穂 本
- Voiced man'yōgana: 煩 菩 番 蕃
- Spelling kana: 保険のホ Hoken no "ho"
- Unicode: U+307B, U+30DB
- Braille: ⠮
- Note: This mora was historically pronounced as "po".

Ho (hiragana: ほ, katakana: ホ) is one of the Japanese kana, each of which represents one mora. Both are made in four strokes and both represent [ho]. In the Sakhalin dialect of the Ainu language, ホ can be written as small ㇹ to represent a final h sound after an o sound (オㇹ oh).

Form	Rōmaji	Hiragana	Katakana
Normal h- (ほ行 ha-gyō)	ho	ほ	ホ
Normal h- (ほ行 ha-gyō)	hou hoo hō	ほう ほお, ほぉ ほー	ホウ ホオ, ホォ ホー
Addition dakuten b- (ぼ行 ba-gyō)	bo	ぼ	ボ
Addition dakuten b- (ぼ行 ba-gyō)	bou boo bō	ぼう, ぼぅ ぼお, ぼぉ ぼー	ボウ, ボゥ ボオ, ボォ ボー
Addition handakuten p- (ぽ行 pa-gyō)	po	ぽ	ポ
Addition handakuten p- (ぽ行 pa-gyō)	pou poo pō	ぽう, ぽぅ ぽお, ぽぉ ぽー	ポウ, ポゥ ポオ, ポォ ポー

Other additional forms

Form (hw-)
Romaji	Hiragana	Katakana
hwa	ほぁ, ほゎ	ホァ, ホヮ
hwi	ほぃ	ホィ
(hu, hwu)	ほぅ	ホゥ
hwe	ほぇ	ホェ
hwo	ほぅぉ	ホゥォ

== Stroke order ==
Stroke order in writing ほ

Stroke order in writing ホ

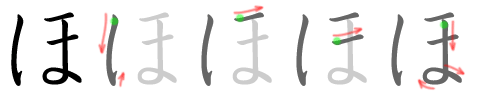
Stroke order in writing ほ

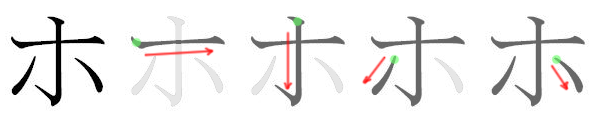
Stroke order in writing ホ

== Other communicative representations ==
Japanese radiotelephony alphabet	Wabun code
保険のホ; Hoken no "Ho"	▄▄▄ ▄ ▄

Japanese Navy Signal Flag

Japanese semaphore
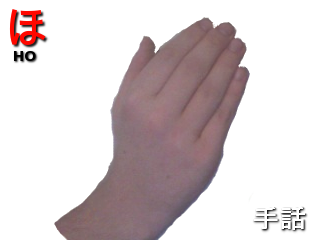
Japanese manual syllabary (fingerspelling)
Braille dots-2346
Japanese Braille

=== Braille forms ===
ほ / ホ in Japanese Braille
ほ / ホ ho	ぼ / ボ bo	ぽ / ポ po	ほう / ホー hō	ぼう / ボー bō	ぽう / ポー pō	Other kana based on Braille ほ					
ほ / ホ ho	ぼ / ボ bo	ぽ / ポ po	ほう / ホー hō	ぼう / ボー bō	ぽう / ポー pō	ひょ / ヒョ hyo	びょ / ビョ byo	ぴょ / ピョ pyo	ひょう / ヒョー hyō	びょう / ビョー byō	ぴょう / ピョー pyō
⠮ (braille pattern dots-2346)	⠐ (braille pattern dots-5) ⠮ (braille pattern dots-2346)	⠠ (braille pattern dots-6) ⠮ (braille pattern dots-2346)	⠮ (braille pattern dots-2346) ⠒ (braille pattern dots-25)	⠐ (braille pattern dots-5) ⠮ (braille pattern dots-2346) ⠒ (braille pattern dots-25)	⠠ (braille pattern dots-6) ⠮ (braille pattern dots-2346) ⠒ (braille pattern dots-25)	⠈ (braille pattern dots-4) ⠮ (braille pattern dots-2346)	⠘ (braille pattern dots-45) ⠮ (braille pattern dots-2346)	⠨ (braille pattern dots-46) ⠮ (braille pattern dots-2346)	⠈ (braille pattern dots-4) ⠮ (braille pattern dots-2346) ⠒ (braille pattern dots-25)	⠘ (braille pattern dots-45) ⠮ (braille pattern dots-2346) ⠒ (braille pattern dots-25)	⠨ (braille pattern dots-46) ⠮ (braille pattern dots-2346) ⠒ (braille pattern dots-25)

=== Computer encodings ===
Character information
Preview	ほ		ホ		ﾎ		ㇹ		㋭	
Unicode name	HIRAGANA LETTER HO		KATAKANA LETTER HO		HALFWIDTH KATAKANA LETTER HO		KATAKANA LETTER SMALL HO		CIRCLED KATAKANA HO	
Encodings	decimal	hex	dec	hex	dec	hex	dec	hex	dec	hex
Unicode	12411	U+307B	12507	U+30DB	65422	U+FF8E	12793	U+31F9	13037	U+32ED
UTF-8	227 129 187	E3 81 BB	227 131 155	E3 83 9B	239 190 142	EF BE 8E	227 135 185	E3 87 B9	227 139 173	E3 8B AD
Numeric character reference	&#12411;	&#x307B;	&#12507;	&#x30DB;	&#65422;	&#xFF8E;	&#12793;	&#x31F9;	&#13037;	&#x32ED;
Shift JIS (plain)	130 217	82 D9	131 122	83 7A	206	CE				
Shift JIS-2004	130 217	82 D9	131 122	83 7A	206	CE	131 245	83 F5		
EUC-JP (plain)	164 219	A4 DB	165 219	A5 DB	142 206	8E CE				
EUC-JIS-2004	164 219	A4 DB	165 219	A5 DB	142 206	8E CE	166 247	A6 F7		
GB 18030	164 219	A4 DB	165 219	A5 DB	132 49 154 50	84 31 9A 32	129 57 189 51	81 39 BD 33		
EUC-KR / UHC	170 219	AA DB	171 219	AB DB						
Big5 (non-ETEN kana)	198 223	C6 DF	199 115	C7 73						
Big5 (ETEN / HKSCS)	199 98	C7 62	199 215	C7 D7						

Character information
Preview	ぼ		ボ		ぽ		ポ	
Unicode name	HIRAGANA LETTER BO		KATAKANA LETTER BO		HIRAGANA LETTER PO		KATAKANA LETTER PO	
Encodings	decimal	hex	dec	hex	dec	hex	dec	hex
Unicode	12412	U+307C	12508	U+30DC	12413	U+307D	12509	U+30DD
UTF-8	227 129 188	E3 81 BC	227 131 156	E3 83 9C	227 129 189	E3 81 BD	227 131 157	E3 83 9D
Numeric character reference	&#12412;	&#x307C;	&#12508;	&#x30DC;	&#12413;	&#x307D;	&#12509;	&#x30DD;
Shift JIS	130 218	82 DA	131 123	83 7B	130 219	82 DB	131 124	83 7C
EUC-JP	164 220	A4 DC	165 220	A5 DC	164 221	A4 DD	165 221	A5 DD
GB 18030	164 220	A4 DC	165 220	A5 DC	164 221	A4 DD	165 221	A5 DD
EUC-KR / UHC	170 220	AA DC	171 220	AB DC	170 221	AA DD	171 221	AB DD
Big5 (non-ETEN kana)	198 224	C6 E0	199 116	C7 74	198 225	C6 E1	199 117	C7 75
Big5 (ETEN / HKSCS)	199 99	C7 63	199 216	C7 D8	199 100	C7 64	199 217	C7 D9
