= Wo (kana) =

Character of the Japanese writing system

wo

Hiragana	Katakana
- Transliteration: o, wo
- Hiragana origin: 遠
- Katakana origin: 乎
- Man'yōgana: 乎 呼 遠 鳥 怨 越 少 小 尾 麻 男 緒 雄
- Spelling kana: 尾張のヲ (W)owari no "(w)o"
- Unicode: U+3092, U+30F2
- Braille: ⠔

Wo (hiragana: を, katakana: ヲ) is one of the Japanese kana, each of which represents one mora. Historically, both are phonemically /wo/, reflected in the Nihon-shiki wo, although the contemporary pronunciation is [o], reflected in the Hepburn romanization and Kunrei-shiki romanization o. Thus it is pronounced identically to the kana o. Despite this phonemic merger, the kana wo is sometimes regarded as a distinct phoneme from /o/, represented as /wo/, to account for historical pronunciation and for orthographic purposes.

== Modern usage ==
In the 1946 orthographic reforms, を was largely replaced by お. In Japanese, this kana is used almost exclusively for a particle for both forms; therefore, the katakana form (ヲ) is rare in everyday language, mostly seen in all-katakana text. A "wo" sound is usually represented as うぉ or ウォ instead.

Despite originally representing [wo], the mora is pronounced [o] by almost all modern speakers. Singers may pronounce it with the [w], as a stylistic effect. Apart from some literate speakers who have revived [wo] as a spelling pronunciation, though, this [wo] sound is extinct in the modern spoken language. Some non-standard dialectal Japanese still pronounce it [wo], notably dialects in the Ehime Prefecture.

In Romaji, the kana is transliterated variably as ⟨o⟩ or ⟨wo⟩, with the former being faithful to standard pronunciation, but the latter avoiding confusion with お and オ, and being in line with the structure of the gojūon. を is transliterated as o in Modified Hepburn and Kunrei and as wo in Traditional Hepburn and Nippon-shiki.

Katakana ヲ can sometimes be combined with a dakuten, ヺ, to represent a /vo/ sound in foreign words; however, most IMEs lack a convenient way to do this as this usage has largely fallen into disuse. The digraph ヴォ is used far more frequently to represent the /vo/ sound.

Form	Rōmaji	Hiragana	Katakana
Normal w- (わ行 wa-gyō)	(w)o	を	ヲ

Hiragana を is still used in several Okinawan orthographies for the mora /o~wo/; in the Ryukyu University system, it is /o/, whereas お is /ʔo/. Katakana ヲ is used in Ainu for /wo/.

== Stroke order ==
Stroke order in writing を

Stroke order in writing ヲ

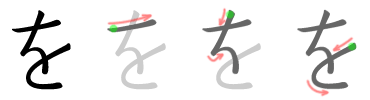
Stroke order in writing を

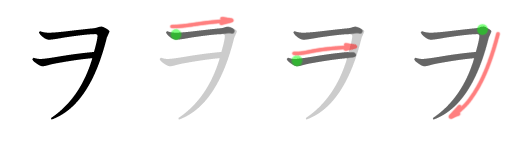
Stroke order in writing ヲ

== Other communicative representations ==
Japanese radiotelephony alphabet	Wabun code
尾張のヲ; Wowari no "Wo"	▄ ▄▄▄ ▄▄▄ ▄▄▄

Japanese Navy Signal Flag

Japanese semaphore

Japanese manual syllabary (fingerspelling)
Braille dots-35
Japanese Braille

=== Braille forms ===
を / ヲ in Japanese Braille
を / ヲ wo	をう / ヲー wō	ヺ vo	ヺー vō
⠔ (braille pattern dots-35)	⠔ (braille pattern dots-35) ⠒ (braille pattern dots-25)	⠐ (braille pattern dots-5) ⠔ (braille pattern dots-35)	⠐ (braille pattern dots-5) ⠔ (braille pattern dots-35) ⠒ (braille pattern dots-25)

=== Computer encodings ===
Character information
Preview	を		ヲ		ｦ		㋾	
Unicode name	HIRAGANA LETTER WO		KATAKANA LETTER WO		HALFWIDTH KATAKANA LETTER WO		CIRCLED KATAKANA WO	
Encodings	decimal	hex	dec	hex	dec	hex	dec	hex
Unicode	12434	U+3092	12530	U+30F2	65382	U+FF66	13054	U+32FE
UTF-8	227 130 146	E3 82 92	227 131 178	E3 83 B2	239 189 166	EF BD A6	227 139 190	E3 8B BE
GB 18030	164 242	A4 F2	165 242	A5 F2	132 49 150 50	84 31 96 32	129 57 214 50	81 39 D6 32
Numeric character reference	&#12434;	&#x3092;	&#12530;	&#x30F2;	&#65382;	&#xFF66;	&#13054;	&#x32FE;
Shift JIS	130 240	82 F0	131 146	83 92	166	A6		
EUC-JP	164 242	A4 F2	165 242	A5 F2	142 166	8E A6		
EUC-KR / UHC	170 242	AA F2	171 242	AB F2				
Big5 (non-ETEN kana)	198 246	C6 F6	199 172	C7 AC				
Big5 (ETEN / HKSCS)	199 121	C7 79	199 238	C7 EE				

Character information
Preview	𛅒		𛅦		ヺ	
Unicode name	HIRAGANA LETTER SMALL WO		KATAKANA LETTER SMALL WO		KATAKANA LETTER VO	
Encodings	decimal	hex	dec	hex	dec	hex
Unicode	110930	U+1B152	110950	U+1B166	12538	U+30FA
UTF-8	240 155 133 146	F0 9B 85 92	240 155 133 166	F0 9B 85 A6	227 131 186	E3 83 BA
UTF-16	55340 56658	D82C DD52	55340 56678	D82C DD66	12538	30FA
GB 18030	147 54 132 52	93 36 84 34	147 54 134 52	93 36 86 34	129 57 167 56	81 39 A7 38
Numeric character reference	&#110930;	&#x1B152;	&#110950;	&#x1B166;	&#12538;	&#x30FA;
Shift JIS (KanjiTalk 7)					136 109	88 6D
Shift JIS-2004					132 149	84 95
EUC-JIS-2004					167 245	A7 F5
