= Ka (kana) =

ka

hiragana	katakana
- transliteration: ka
- translit. with dakuten: ga
- translit. with handakuten: (nga)
- hiragana origin: 加
- katakana origin: 加
- Man'yōgana: 可 何 加 架 香 蚊 迦
- Voiced Man'yōgana: 我 何 賀
- spelling kana: 為替のカ (Kawase no "ka")

Ka (hiragana: か, katakana: カ) is one of the Japanese kana, which each represent one mora. Both represent [ka]. The shapes of these kana both originate from 加.

The character can be combined with a dakuten, to form が in hiragana, ガ in katakana and ga in Hepburn romanization. The phonetic value of the modified character is [ɡa] in initial positions and varying between [ŋa] and [ɣa] in the middle of words.

A handakuten (゜) does not occur with ka in normal Japanese text, but it may be used by linguists to indicate a nasal pronunciation [ŋa].

か is the most commonly used interrogatory particle. It is also sometimes used to delimit choices.

が is a Japanese case marker, as well as a conjunctive particle. It is used to denote the focus of attention in a sentence, especially to the grammatical subject.

Form	Rōmaji	Hiragana	Katakana
Normal k- (か行 ka-gyō)	ka	か	カ
Normal k- (か行 ka-gyō)	kaa kā	かあ, かぁ かー	カア, カァ カー
Addition of dakuten g- (が行 ga-gyō)	ga	が	ガ
Addition of dakuten g- (が行 ga-gyō)	gaa gā	があ, がぁ がー	ガア, ガァ ガー

== Stroke order ==
Stroke order in writing か

Stroke order in writing カ

Stroke order in writing か

The Hiragana か is made with three strokes:

1. A horizontal line which turns and ends in a hook facing left.
2. A curved vertical line that cuts through the first line.
3. A small curved line on the right.

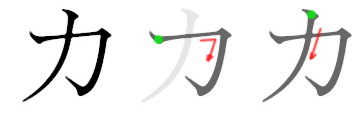
Stroke order in writing カ

The Katakana カ is made with two strokes:

1. A horizontal line which turns and ends in a hook facing left.
2. A curved vertical line that cuts through the first line.

== Other communicative representations ==
Japanese radiotelephony alphabet	Wabun code
為替のカ; Kawase no "Ka"	▄ ▄▄▄ ▄ ▄

Japanese Navy Signal Flag

Japanese semaphore
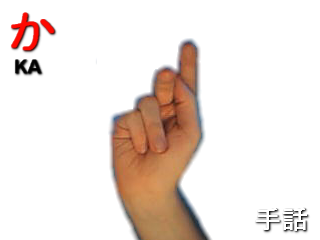
Japanese manual syllabary (fingerspelling)
Braille dots-16
Japanese Braille

=== Braille representation ===
か / カ in Japanese Braille				Other kana based on Braille か			
か / カ ka	が / ガ ga	かあ / カー kā	があ / ガー gā	きゃ / キャ kya	ぎゃ / ギャ gya	きゃあ / キャー kyā	ぎゃあ / ギャー gyā
⠡ (braille pattern dots-16)	⠐ (braille pattern dots-5) ⠡ (braille pattern dots-16)	⠡ (braille pattern dots-16) ⠒ (braille pattern dots-25)	⠐ (braille pattern dots-5) ⠡ (braille pattern dots-16) ⠒ (braille pattern dots-25)	⠈ (braille pattern dots-4) ⠡ (braille pattern dots-16)	⠘ (braille pattern dots-45) ⠡ (braille pattern dots-16)	⠈ (braille pattern dots-4) ⠡ (braille pattern dots-16) ⠒ (braille pattern dots-25)	⠘ (braille pattern dots-45) ⠡ (braille pattern dots-16) ⠒ (braille pattern dots-25)

=== Computer encodings ===
Character information
Preview	か		カ		ｶ		ゕ		ヵ	
Unicode name	HIRAGANA LETTER KA		KATAKANA LETTER KA		HALFWIDTH KATAKANA LETTER KA		HIRAGANA LETTER SMALL KA		KATAKANA LETTER SMALL KA	
Encodings	decimal	hex	dec	hex	dec	hex	dec	hex	dec	hex
Unicode	12363	U+304B	12459	U+30AB	65398	U+FF76	12437	U+3095	12533	U+30F5
UTF-8	227 129 139	E3 81 8B	227 130 171	E3 82 AB	239 189 182	EF BD B6	227 130 149	E3 82 95	227 131 181	E3 83 B5
Numeric character reference	&#12363;	&#x304B;	&#12459;	&#x30AB;	&#65398;	&#xFF76;	&#12437;	&#x3095;	&#12533;	&#x30F5;
Shift JIS (plain)	130 169	82 A9	131 74	83 4A	182	B6			131 149	83 95
Shift JIS-2004	130 169	82 A9	131 74	83 4A	182	B6	130 243	82 F3	131 149	83 95
EUC-JP (plain)	164 171	A4 AB	165 171	A5 AB	142 182	8E B6			165 245	A5 F5
EUC-JIS-2004	164 171	A4 AB	165 171	A5 AB	142 182	8E B6	164 245	A4 F5	165 245	A5 F5
GB 18030	164 171	A4 AB	165 171	A5 AB	132 49 151 56	84 31 97 38	129 57 166 55	81 39 A6 37	165 245	A5 F5
EUC-KR / UHC	170 171	AA AB	171 171	AB AB					171 245	AB F5
Big5 (non-ETEN kana)	198 175	C6 AF	199 67	C7 43					199 175	C7 AF
Big5 (ETEN / HKSCS)	198 241	C6 F1	199 167	C7 A7					199 241	C7 F1

Character information
Preview	が		ガ		か゚		カ゚		㋕	
Unicode name	HIRAGANA LETTER GA		KATAKANA LETTER GA		HIRAGANA LETTER BIDAKUON NGA		KATAKANA LETTER BIDAKUON NGA		CIRCLED KATAKANA KA	
Encodings	decimal	hex	dec	hex	dec	hex	dec	hex	dec	hex
Unicode	12364	U+304C	12460	U+30AC	12363 12442	U+304B+309A	12459 12442	U+30AB+309A	13013	U+32D5
UTF-8	227 129 140	E3 81 8C	227 130 172	E3 82 AC	227 129 139 227 130 154	E3 81 8B E3 82 9A	227 130 171 227 130 154	E3 82 AB E3 82 9A	227 139 149	E3 8B 95
Numeric character reference	&#12364;	&#x304C;	&#12460;	&#x30AC;	&#12363;&#12442;	&#x304B;&#x309A;	&#12459;&#12442;	&#x30AB;&#x309A;	&#13013;	&#x32D5;
Shift JIS (plain)	130 170	82 AA	131 75	83 4B						
Shift JIS-2004	130 170	82 AA	131 75	83 4B	130 245	82 F5	131 151	83 97		
EUC-JP (plain)	164 172	A4 AC	165 172	A5 AC						
EUC-JIS-2004	164 172	A4 AC	165 172	A5 AC	164 247	A4 F7	165 247	A5 F7		
GB 18030	164 172	A4 AC	165 172	A5 AC					129 57 210 49	81 39 D2 31
EUC-KR / UHC	170 172	AA AC	171 172	AB AC						
Big5 (non-ETEN kana)	198 176	C6 B0	199 68	C7 44						
Big5 (ETEN / HKSCS)	198 242	C6 F2	199 168	C7 A8						
