= Ke (kana) =

ke

Hiragana	Katakana
- Transliteration: ke
- Translit. with dakuten: ge
- Translit. with handakuten: (nge)
- Hiragana origin: 計
- Katakana origin: 介
- Man'yōgana: 祁 家 計 係 價 結 鶏 気 既 毛 飼 消
- Voiced man'yōgana: 下 牙 雅 夏 義 気 宜 礙 削
- Spelling kana: 景色のケ (Keshiki no "ke")
- Note: These Man'yōgana originally represented morae with one of two different vowel sounds, which merged in later pronunciation.

Ke (hiragana: け, katakana: ケ) is one of the Japanese kana, each of which represents one mora. Both represent [ke]. The shape of these kana come from the kanji 計 and 介, respectively.

A dakuten may be added to this character; this changes it to げ in hiragana, ゲ in katakana, ge in Hepburn romanization and the pronunciation shifts to [ɡe] in initial positions and varying between [ŋe] and [ɣe] in the middle of words.

A handakuten (゜) does not occur with ke in normal Japanese text, but it may be used by linguists to indicate a nasal pronunciation [ŋe].

Form	Rōmaji	Hiragana	Katakana
Normal k- (か行 ka-gyō)	ke	け	ケ
Normal k- (か行 ka-gyō)	kei kee kē	けい, けぃ けえ, けぇ けー	ケイ, ケィ ケエ, ケェ ケー
Addition dakuten g- (が行 ga-gyō)	ge	げ	ゲ
Addition dakuten g- (が行 ga-gyō)	gei gee gē	げい, げぃ げえ, げぇ げー	ゲイ, ゲィ ゲエ, ゲェ ゲー

== Stroke order ==
Stroke order in writing け

Stroke order in writing ケ

Stroke order in writing け

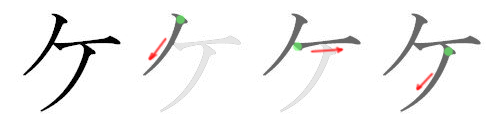
Stroke order in writing ケ

== Other communicative representations ==
Japanese radiotelephony alphabet	Wabun code
景色のケ; Keshiki no "Ke"	▄▄▄ ▄ ▄▄▄ ▄▄▄

Japanese Navy Signal Flag

Japanese semaphore
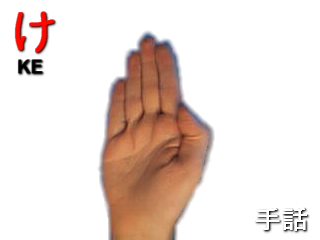
Japanese manual syllabary (fingerspelling)
Braille dots-1246
Japanese Braille

=== Braille forms ===
け / ケ in Japanese Braille
け / ケ ke	げ / ゲ ge	けい / ケー kē/kei	げい / ゲー gē/gei
⠫ (braille pattern dots-1246)	⠐ (braille pattern dots-5) ⠫ (braille pattern dots-1246)	⠫ (braille pattern dots-1246) ⠒ (braille pattern dots-25)	⠐ (braille pattern dots-5) ⠫ (braille pattern dots-1246) ⠒ (braille pattern dots-25)

=== Computer encodings ===
Character information
Preview	け		ケ		ｹ		ゖ		ヶ	
Unicode name	HIRAGANA LETTER KE		KATAKANA LETTER KE		HALFWIDTH KATAKANA LETTER KE		HIRAGANA LETTER SMALL KE		KATAKANA LETTER SMALL KE	
Encodings	decimal	hex	dec	hex	dec	hex	dec	hex	dec	hex
Unicode	12369	U+3051	12465	U+30B1	65401	U+FF79	12438	U+3096	12534	U+30F6
UTF-8	227 129 145	E3 81 91	227 130 177	E3 82 B1	239 189 185	EF BD B9	227 130 150	E3 82 96	227 131 182	E3 83 B6
Numeric character reference	&#12369;	&#x3051;	&#12465;	&#x30B1;	&#65401;	&#xFF79;	&#12438;	&#x3096;	&#12534;	&#x30F6;
Shift JIS (plain)	130 175	82 AF	131 80	83 50	185	B9			131 150	83 96
Shift JIS-2004	130 175	82 AF	131 80	83 50	185	B9	130 244	82 F4	131 150	83 96
EUC-JP (plain)	164 177	A4 B1	165 177	A5 B1	142 185	8E B9			165 246	A5 F6
EUC-JIS-2004	164 177	A4 B1	165 177	A5 B1	142 185	8E B9	164 246	A4 F6	165 246	A5 F6
GB 18030	164 177	A4 B1	165 177	A5 B1	132 49 152 49	84 31 98 31	129 57 166 56	81 39 A6 38	165 246	A5 F6
EUC-KR / UHC	170 177	AA B1	171 177	AB B1					171 246	AB F6
Big5 (non-ETEN kana)	198 181	C6 B5	199 73	C7 49					199 176	C7 B0
Big5 (ETEN / HKSCS)	198 247	C6 F7	199 173	C7 AD	199 242	C7 F2				

Character information
Preview	げ		ゲ		け゚		ケ゚		㋘	
Unicode name	HIRAGANA LETTER GE		KATAKANA LETTER GE		HIRAGANA LETTER BIDAKUON NGE		KATAKANA LETTER BIDAKUON NGE		CIRCLED KATAKANA KE	
Encodings	decimal	hex	dec	hex	dec	hex	dec	hex	dec	hex
Unicode	12370	U+3052	12466	U+30B2	12369 12442	U+3051+309A	12465 12442	U+30B1+309A	13016	U+32D8
UTF-8	227 129 146	E3 81 92	227 130 178	E3 82 B2	227 129 145 227 130 154	E3 81 91 E3 82 9A	227 130 177 227 130 154	E3 82 B1 E3 82 9A	227 139 152	E3 8B 98
Numeric character reference	&#12370;	&#x3052;	&#12466;	&#x30B2;	&#12369;&#12442;	&#x3051;&#x309A;	&#12465;&#12442;	&#x30B1;&#x309A;	&#13016;	&#x32D8;
Shift JIS (plain)	130 176	82 B0	131 81	83 51						
Shift JIS-2004	130 176	82 B0	131 81	83 51	130 248	82 F8	131 154	83 9A		
EUC-JP (plain)	164 178	A4 B2	165 178	A5 B2						
EUC-JIS-2004	164 178	A4 B2	165 178	A5 B2	164 250	A4 FA	165 250	A5 FA		
GB 18030	164 178	A4 B2	165 178	A5 B2						
EUC-KR / UHC	170 178	AA B2	171 178	AB B2						
Big5 (non-ETEN kana)	198 182	C6 B6	199 74	C7 4A						
Big5 (ETEN / HKSCS)	198 248	C6 F8	199 174	C7 AE						

== See also ==
- Small ke (ヶ)
