= O (kana) =

o

Hiragana	Katakana
- Transliteration: o
- Hiragana origin: 於
- Katakana origin: 於
- Man'yōgana: 意 憶 於 應
- Spelling kana: 大阪のオ (Ōsaka no "o")

O (hiragana: お, katakana: オ) is one of the Japanese kana, each of which represents one mora. In the modern Japanese system of alphabetical order, they occupy the fifth place in the modern Gojūon (五十音) system of collating kana. In the Iroha, they occupy the 27th, between の and く. In the table at right (ordered by columns, from right to left), お lies in the first column (あ行, "column A") and the fifth row (お段, "row O"). Both represent [o].

Form	Rōmaji	Hiragana	Katakana
Normal a/i/u/e/o (あ行 a-gyō)	o	お	オ
Normal a/i/u/e/o (あ行 a-gyō)	ou oo ō	おう, おぅ おお, おぉ おー	オウ, オゥ オオ, オォ オー

== Derivation ==
お and オ originate, via man'yōgana, from the kanji 於.

== Variant forms ==
Scaled-down versions of the kana (ぉ, ォ) are used to express morae foreign to the Japanese language, such as フォ (fo).

== Stroke order ==
Stroke order in writing お

Stroke order in writing オ

Stroke order in writing お

The hiragana お is made with three strokes:

1. A horizontal line from left to right.
2. A stroke consisting of a vertical line, a small diagonal line going upwards and to the left, and an open curve heading right and downwards.
3. A small curved stroke on the right.

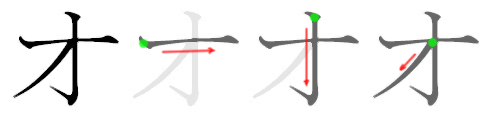
Stroke order in writing オ

The katakana オ is made with three strokes:

1. At the top, a horizontal stroke from left to right.
2. A downward vertical stroke cutting through the first stroke, with a small hook at the end facing left.
3. At the intersection of the first two strokes, a diagonal line going downwards and to the left.

== Other communicative representations ==
Japanese radiotelephony alphabet	Wabun code
大阪のオ; Ōsaka no "O"	▄ ▄▄▄ ▄ ▄ ▄

Japanese Navy Signal Flag

Japanese semaphore
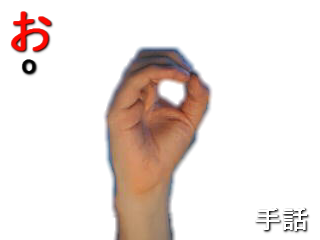
Japanese manual syllabary (fingerspelling)
Braille dots-24
Japanese Braille

=== Braille forms ===
お / オ in Japanese Braille
お / オ o	おう / オー ō/ou	+う / +ー chōon*
⠊ (braille pattern dots-24)	⠊ (braille pattern dots-24) ⠒ (braille pattern dots-25)	⠒ (braille pattern dots-25)

* When lengthening "-o" morae in Japanese braille, a chōon is always used, as in standard katakana usage instead of adding an お / オ.

=== Computer encodings ===
Character information
Preview	お		オ		ｵ		㋔	
Unicode name	HIRAGANA LETTER O		KATAKANA LETTER O		HALFWIDTH KATAKANA LETTER O		CIRCLED KATAKANA O	
Encodings	decimal	hex	dec	hex	dec	hex	dec	hex
Unicode	12362	U+304A	12458	U+30AA	65397	U+FF75	13012	U+32D4
UTF-8	227 129 138	E3 81 8A	227 130 170	E3 82 AA	239 189 181	EF BD B5	227 139 148	E3 8B 94
Numeric character reference	&#12362;	&#x304A;	&#12458;	&#x30AA;	&#65397;	&#xFF75;	&#13012;	&#x32D4;
Shift JIS	130 168	82 A8	131 73	83 49	181	B5		
EUC-JP	164 170	A4 AA	165 170	A5 AA	142 181	8E B5		
GB 18030	164 170	A4 AA	165 170	A5 AA	132 49 151 55	84 31 97 37	129 57 210 48	81 39 D2 30
EUC-KR / UHC	170 170	AA AA	171 170	AB AA				
Big5 (non-ETEN kana)	198 174	C6 AE	199 66	C7 42				
Big5 (ETEN / HKSCS)	198 240	C6 F0	199 166	C7 A6				

Character information
Preview	ぉ		ォ		ｫ	
Unicode name	HIRAGANA LETTER SMALL O		KATAKANA LETTER SMALL O		HALFWIDTH KATAKANA LETTER SMALL O	
Encodings	decimal	hex	dec	hex	dec	hex
Unicode	12361	U+3049	12457	U+30A9	65387	U+FF6B
UTF-8	227 129 137	E3 81 89	227 130 169	E3 82 A9	239 189 171	EF BD AB
Numeric character reference	&#12361;	&#x3049;	&#12457;	&#x30A9;	&#65387;	&#xFF6B;
Shift JIS	130 167	82 A7	131 72	83 48	171	AB
EUC-JP	164 169	A4 A9	165 169	A5 A9	142 171	8E AB
GB 18030	164 169	A4 A9	165 169	A5 A9	132 49 150 55	84 31 96 37
EUC-KR / UHC	170 169	AA A9	171 169	AB A9		
Big5 (non-ETEN kana)	198 173	C6 AD	199 65	C7 41		
Big5 (ETEN / HKSCS)	198 239	C6 EF	199 165	C7 A5		
