= Kana =

Japanese syllabic writing systems

- "Kana" written in katakana (left) and hiragana (right)
- Script type: Syllabary
- Period: c. 800 – present
- Direction: Vertical right-to-left, left-to-right
- Region: Japan
- Languages: Japanese, Ryukyuan languages, Ainu

Related scripts
- Parent systems: Oracle bone script: Seal script; Clerical script; Regular script (Chinese characters); Kanji; Kana

ISO 15924
- ISO 15924: Hrkt (412), Japanese syllabaries (alias for Hiragana + Katakana)

Unicode
- Unicode alias: Katakana or Hiragana
- Unicode range: U+3040–U+309F Hiragana; U+30A0–U+30FF Katakana

Kana (仮名; Japanese pronunciation: [kä̀.nä́]) are syllabaries used to write Japanese phonological units, morae. In current usage, kana most commonly refers to hiragana and katakana. It can also refer to their ancestor magana (真仮名; [mä̀.ɡä́.nä́, -ŋä́-] lit. 'true kana'), which were Chinese characters used phonetically to transcribe Japanese (e.g. man'yōgana); and hentaigana, which are historical variants of the now-standard hiragana.

Katakana, with a few additions, are also used to write Ainu. A number of systems exist to write the Ryūkyūan languages, in particular Okinawan, in hiragana. Taiwanese kana were used in Taiwanese Hokkien as ruby text for Chinese characters in Taiwan when it was under Japanese rule.

Each kana character corresponds to one phoneme or syllable, unlike kanji, which generally each corresponds to a morpheme. Apart from the five vowels, it is always CV (consonant onset with vowel nucleus), such as ka, ki, sa, shi, etc., with the sole exception of the C grapheme for nasal codas usually romanised as n. The structure has led some scholars to label the system moraic, instead of syllabic, because it requires the combination of two syllabograms to represent a CVC syllable with coda (e.g. CVn, CVm, CVng), a CVV syllable with complex nucleus (i.e. multiple or expressively long vowels), or a CCV syllable with complex onset (i.e. including a glide, CyV, CwV).

The limited number of phonemes in Japanese, as well as the relatively rigid syllable structure, makes the kana system a very accurate representation of spoken Japanese.

== Etymology ==
Kana is a compound of kari (仮; lit. 'borrowed' or 'assumed' or 'false') and na (名; lit. 'name'), which eventually collapsed into kanna and ultimately kana. Kana were so called in contrast with mana (真名; lit. 'true name') which were kanji used "regularly" (kanji used for their meanings as they are now), or more specifically the regular script (楷書, kaisho) writing of such kanji.

It was not until the 18th century that the early-nationalist kokugaku movement, which promoted a move away from Sinocentric academia, began to reanalyze the script from a phonological point of view. In the following centuries, contrary to the traditional Sinocentric view, kana began to be considered a national Japanese writing system that was distinct from Chinese characters, which is the dominant view today.

== Terms ==
Although the term 'kana' is now commonly understood as hiragana and katakana, it actually has broader application as listed below:

- Kana (仮名; [kä̀.nä́], lit. 'false name') or kana (仮字; lit. 'false character'): a syllabary.
  - Magana (真仮名; [mä̀.ɡä́.nä́, mä̀.ŋä́.nä́, mä́.ɡä̀.nä̀, mä́.ŋä̀.nä̀], lit. 'true kana') or otokogana (男仮名; [ò̞.tó̞.kó̞.ɡä̀.nä̀, -ŋä̀-], lit. 'men's kana'): phonetic kanji used as syllabary characters, historically used by men (who were more educated).
    - Man'yōgana/Mannyōgana (万葉仮名; [mä̀ɰ̃́.jó̞ó̞.ɡä́.nä́, -ŋä́.nä́, -ɡä̀.nä̀, -ŋä̀.nä̀, mä́ɰ̃́-], lit. 'kana used in the Man'yōshū'): the most prominent system of magana.
      - Sōgana (草仮名; [sò̞ó̞.ɡä́.nä́, -ŋä́.nä́, só̞ó̞-], lit. 'sloppy kana'): cursive man'yōgana.
        - Hiragana (平仮名; [çì.ɾä́.ɡä̀.nä̀, -ŋä̀.nä̀, -ɡä́.nä́, -ŋä́.nä́], lit. 'flat kana'), onnagana (女仮名; [ò̞ń.nä́.ɡä̀.nä̀, -ŋä̀-, ó̞ń-], lit. 'women's kana'), onnamoji (女文字; [ò̞ń.nä́.mó̞.(ɟ̟͡)ʑì, ó̞ń-], lit. 'women's script'), onnade (女手; [ò̞ń.nä́.dé̞, ó̞ń-], lit. 'women's hands') or irohagana (伊呂波仮名; [ì.ɾó̞.hä́.ɡä́.nä́, -ŋä́-]): a syllabary derived from simplified sōgana, historically used by women (who were less educated), historically sorted in Iroha order.
          - Hentaigana (変体仮名; [hè̞ń.tä́í.ɡä́.nä́, -tä́í.ŋä́.nä́, -tä́ì.ɡä̀.nä̀, -tä́ì.ŋä̀.nä̀], lit. 'variant kana') or itaigana (異体仮名; [ì.tä́ì.ɡä̀.nä̀, -ŋä̀-]): obsolete variants of hiragana.
      - Katakana (片仮名; [kä̀.tä́.kä́.nä̀, -kä̀-], lit. 'fragmented kana') or gojūongana (五十音仮名; [ɡò̞.(ɟ̟͡)ʑɨ́ɨ́.ó̞ŋ́.ɡä́.nä́, -ŋä́-], lit. 'fifty-sound kana'): a syllabary derived by using bits of characters in man'yōgana, historically sorted in gojūon order.
      - Yamatogana (大和仮名; [jä̀.mä́.tó̞.ɡä̀.nä̀, -ŋä̀-], lit. 'Yamato's kana'): hiragana and katakana, as opposed to kanji.
    - Ongana (音仮名; [ò̞ŋ́.ɡä́.nä́, -ŋä́-, ó̞ŋ́-], lit. 'sound kana'): magana for transcribing Japanese words, using, strict or loose, Chinese-derived readings (on'yomi). For example, yama (山; lit. 'mountain') would be spelt as 也末, with two magana with on'yomi for ya and ma; likewise, hito (人; lit. 'human') spelt as 比登 for hi and to.
    - Kungana (訓仮名; [kɯ̈̀ŋ́.ɡä́.nä́, -ŋä́-, kɯ̈́ŋ́-], lit. 'translation kana'): magana for transcribing Japanese words, using native words ascribed to kanji (native "readings" or kun'yomi). For example, Yamato (大和) would be spelt as 八間跡, with three magana with kun'yomi for ya, ma and to; likewise, natsukashi (懐かし; lit. 'evoking nostalgia') spelt as 夏樫 for natsu and kashi.
- Mana (真名; [mä́.nä̀], lit. 'true name'), mana (真字; lit. 'true character'), otokomoji (男文字; [ò̞.tó̞.kó̞.mó̞.(ɟ̟͡)ʑì], lit. 'men's script') or otokode (男手; [ò̞.tó̞.kó̞.dé̞], lit. 'men's hands'): kanji used for meanings, historically used by men (who were more educated).
- Shinkatakana (真片仮名; [ɕìŋ́.kä́.tä́.kä́.nä̀, ɕíŋ́-], lit. 'mana and katakana'): mixed script including only kanji and katakana.

== Hiragana and katakana ==
The following table reads, in gojūon order, as a, i, u, e, o (down first column), then ka, ki, ku, ke, ko (down second column), and so on. n appears on its own at the end. Asterisks mark unused combinations.

Japanese kana: hiragana (left) and katakana (right) (Image of this table)
	–	k	s	t	n	h	m	y	r	w
a	あア	かカ	さサ	たタ	なナ	はハ	まマ	やヤ	らラ	わワ
i	いイ	きキ	しシ	ちチ	にニ	ひヒ	みミ	𛀆𛄠*	りリ	ゐヰ
u	うウ	くク	すス	つツ	ぬヌ	ふフ	むム	ゆユ	るル	𛄟𛄢*
e	えエ	けケ	せセ	てテ	ねネ	へヘ	めメ	𛀁𛄡*	れレ	ゑヱ
o	おオ	こコ	そソ	とト	のノ	ほホ	もモ	よヨ	ろロ	をヲ

んン
(n)

- There are presently no kana for ye, yi or wu, as corresponding syllables do not occur natively in modern Japanese.
  - The [jɛ] (ye) sound is believed to have existed in pre-Classical Japanese, mostly before the advent of kana, and can be represented by the man'yōgana kanji 江. There was an archaic Hiragana derived from the man'yōgana ye kanji 江, which is encoded into Unicode at code point U+1B001 (𛀁), but it is not widely supported. It is believed that e and ye first merged to ye before shifting back to e during the Edo period. As demonstrated by 17th-century European sources, the syllable we (ゑ・ヱ ) also came to be pronounced as [jɛ] (ye). If necessary, the modern orthography allows [je] (ye) to be written as いぇ (イェ), but this usage is limited and nonstandard.
  - The modern Katakana e, エ, derives from the man'yōgana 江, originally pronounced ye; a "Katakana letter Archaic E" derived from the man'yōgana 衣 (e) is encoded into Unicode at code point U+1B000 (𛀀), due to being used for that purpose in scholarly works on classical Japanese.
  - Some gojūon tables published during the 19th century list additional Katakana in the ye, wu and yi positions. These are not presently used, and the latter two sounds never existed in Japanese. They were added to Unicode in version 14.0 in 2021. These sources also list (Unicode U+1B006, 𛀆) in the Hiragana yi position, and in the ye position.
- Although removed from the standard orthography with the gendai kanazukai reforms, wi and we still see stylistic use, as in ウヰスキー for whiskey and ヱビス or ゑびす for Japanese kami Ebisu, and Yebisu, a brand of beer named after Ebisu. Hiragana wi and we are preserved in certain Okinawan scripts, while katakana wi and we are preserved in the Ainu language.
- wo is preserved only as the accusative particle, normally occurring only in hiragana.
- si, ti, tu, hu, wi, we and wo are usually romanized respectively as shi, chi, tsu, fu, i, e and o instead, according to present-day pronunciation.
- the sokuon or small tsu (っ/ッ) indicates gemination and is romanized by repeating the following consonant. For example, って is romanized tte (exception: っち becomes tchi).

=== Diacritics ===
Syllables beginning with the voiced consonants [g], [z], [d] and [b] are spelled with kana from the corresponding unvoiced columns (k, s, t and h) and the voicing mark, dakuten (which resembles a quotation mark). Syllables beginning with [p] are spelled with kana from the h column and the half-voicing mark, handakuten (a small circle, similar to a degree sign).

Dakuten and handakuten diacritic marks, hiragana (left) and katakana (right)
	g	z	d	b	p	ng	l
a	がガ	ざザ	だダ	ばバ	ぱパ	か゚カ゚	ら゚ラ゚
i	ぎギ	じジ	ぢヂ	びビ	ぴピ	き゚キ゚	り゚リ゚
u	ぐグ	ずズ	づヅ	ぶブ	ぷプ	く゚ク゚	る゚ル゚
e	げゲ	ぜゼ	でデ	べベ	ぺペ	け゚ケ゚	れ゚レ゚
o	ごゴ	ぞゾ	どド	ぼボ	ぽポ	こ゚コ゚	ろ゚ロ゚

- Note that the か゚, ら゚ and the remaining entries in the two rightmost columns, though they exist, are not used in standard Japanese orthography.
- zi, di, and du are often transcribed into English as ji, ji, and zu instead, respectively, according to contemporary pronunciation.
- Usually, [va], [vi], [vu], [ve], [vo] are represented respectively by バ[ba], ビ[bi], ブ[bu], ベ[be], and ボ[bo], for example, in loanwords such as バイオリン (baiorin "violin"), but (less usually) the distinction can be preserved by using [w-] with voicing marks or by using [wu] and a vowel kana, as in ヴァ(ヷ), ヴィ(ヸ), ヴ, ヴェ(ヹ), and ヴォ(ヺ). Note that ヴ did not have a JIS-encoded Hiragana form (ゔ) until JIS X 0213, meaning that many Shift JIS flavours (including the Windows and HTML5 version) can only represent it as a katakana, although Unicode supports both.

=== Digraphs ===
Syllables beginning with palatalized consonants are spelled with one of the seven consonantal kana from the i row followed by small ya, yu or yo. These digraphs are called yōon.

Yōon digraphs, hiragana
	k	s	t	n	h	m	r
ya	きゃ	しゃ	ちゃ	にゃ	ひゃ	みゃ	りゃ
yu	きゅ	しゅ	ちゅ	にゅ	ひゅ	みゅ	りゅ
yo	きょ	しょ	ちょ	にょ	ひょ	みょ	りょ

- There are no digraphs for the semivowel y and w columns.
- The digraphs are usually transcribed with three letters, leaving out the i: CyV. For example, きゃ is transcribed as kya to distinguish it from the two-kana きや, kiya.
- si+y* and ti+y* are often transcribed sh* and ch* instead of sy* and ty*. For example, しゃ is transcribed as sha, and ちゅ is transcribed as chu.
- In earlier Japanese, digraphs could also be formed with w-kana. Although obsolete in modern Japanese, the digraphs くゎ (/kʷa/) and くゐ/くうぃ(/kʷi/), are preserved in certain Okinawan orthographies. In addition, the kana え can be used in Okinawan to form the digraph くぇ, which represents the /kʷe/ sound.
- In loanwords, digraphs with a small e-kana can be formed. For example, キェ (or きぇ in hiragana), which is transcribed as kye.

Yōon digraphs with dakuten and handakuten, hiragana
	g	j (z)	j (d)	b	p	ng
ya	ぎゃ	じゃ	ぢゃ	びゃ	ぴゃ	き゚ゃ
yu	ぎゅ	じゅ	ぢゅ	びゅ	ぴゅ	き゚ゅ
yo	ぎょ	じょ	ぢょ	びょ	ぴょ	き゚ょ

- Note that the き゚ゃ, き゚ゅ and き゚ょ, though they exist, are not used in standard Japanese orthography.
- zi+y* and di+y* are often transcribed j* instead of zy* and dy*, according to contemporary pronunciation. The form jy* is also used in some cases.

== Modern usage ==
The difference in usage between hiragana and katakana is stylistic. Usually, hiragana is the default syllabary, and katakana is used in certain special cases. Hiragana is used to write native Japanese words with no kanji representation (or whose kanji is thought obscure or difficult), as well as grammatical elements such as particles and inflections (okurigana). Today katakana is most commonly used to write words of foreign origin that do not have kanji representations, as well as foreign personal and place names. Katakana is also used to represent onomatopoeia and interjections, emphasis, technical and scientific terms, transcriptions of the Sino-Japanese readings of kanji, and some corporate branding.

Kana can be written in small form above or next to lesser-known kanji in order to show pronunciation; this is called furigana. Furigana is used most widely in children's or learners' books. Literature for young children who do not yet know kanji may dispense with it altogether and instead use hiragana combined with spaces.

Systems supporting only a limited set of characters, such as Wabun code for Morse code telegrams and single-byte digital character encodings such as JIS X 0201 or EBCDIK, likewise dispense with kanji, instead using only katakana. This is not necessary in systems supporting double-byte or variable-width encodings such as Shift JIS, EUC-JP, UTF-8 or UTF-16.

== History ==
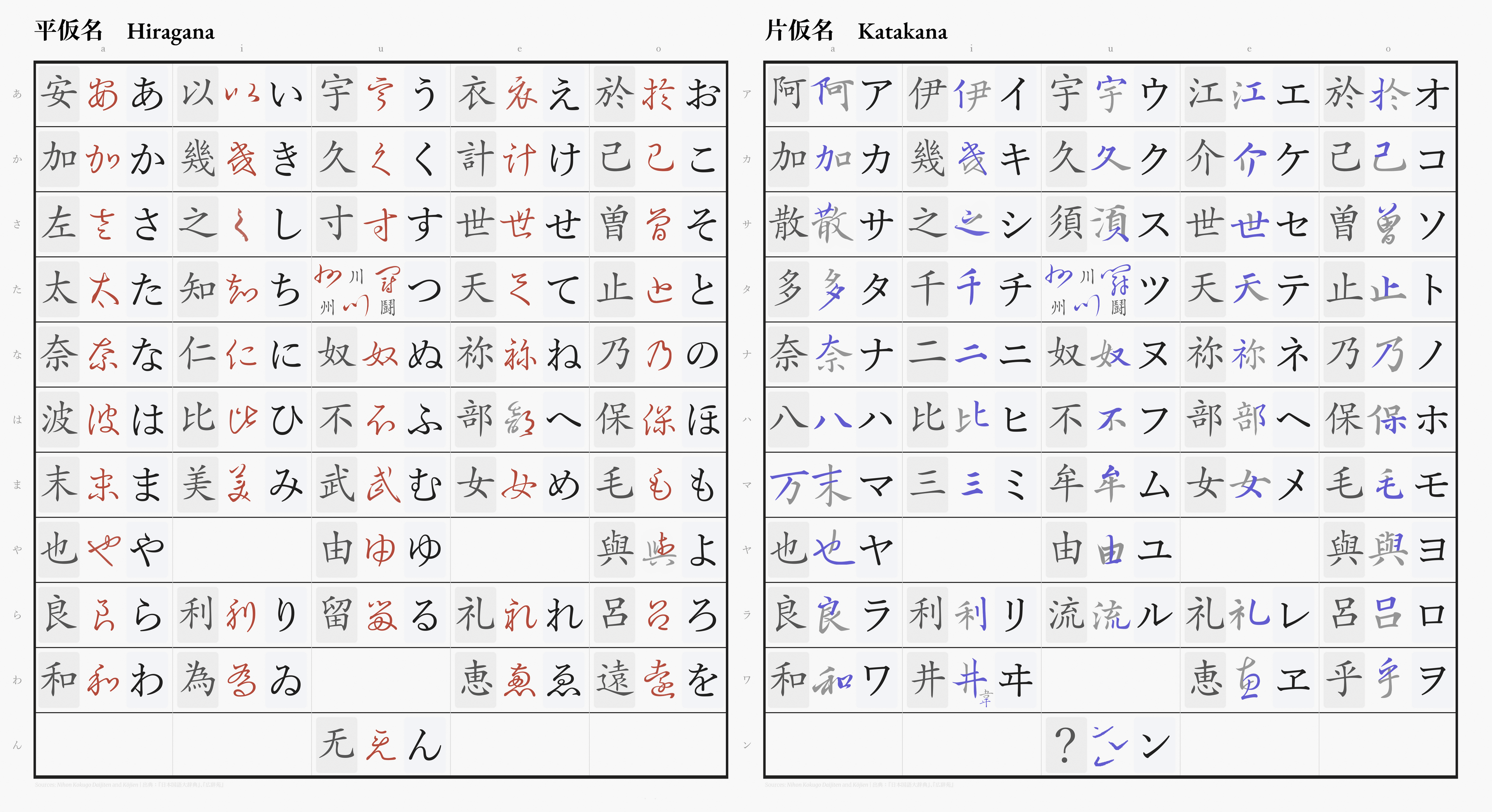
Development of hiragana and katakana

Old Japanese was written entirely in kanji, and a set of kanji called man'yōgana were first used to represent the phonetic values of grammatical particles and morphemes. As there was no consistent method of sound representation, a phoneme could be represented by multiple kanji, and even those kana's pronunciations differed in whether they were to be read as kungana (訓仮名, "meaning kana") or ongana (音仮名, "sound kana"), making decipherment problematic. The man'yōshū, a poetry anthology assembled sometime after 759 and the eponym of man'yōgana, exemplifies this phenomenon, where as many as almost twenty kanji were used for the mora ka. The consistency of the kana used was thus dependent on the style of the writer. Hiragana developed as a distinct script from cursive man'yōgana, whereas katakana developed from abbreviated parts of regular script man'yōgana as a glossing system to add readings or explanations to Buddhist sutras. Both of these systems were simplified to make writing easier. The shapes of many hiragana resembled the Chinese cursive script, as did those of many katakana the Korean gugyeol, suggesting that the Japanese followed the continental pattern of their neighbors.

Kana is traditionally said to have been invented by the Buddhist priest Kūkai in the ninth century. Kūkai certainly brought the Siddhaṃ script of India home on his return from China in 806; his interest in the sacred aspects of speech and writing led him to the conclusion that Japanese would be better represented by a phonetic alphabet than by the kanji which had been used up to that point. The modern arrangement of kana reflects that of the devanagari order used for Sanskrit in the Buddhist Siddhaṃ script hybrid known by the Japanese at the time, before, the traditional iroha arrangement used to follow the order of a poem which uses each kana once. Kana's vowel (a-i-u-e-o) and consonant (k, s, t, n, h, m, y, r, w) order coincide with the Sanskrit order, except for the letter s, but that is explained by the properties of Old Japanese and the version of Siddham buddhist monks learnt at the time. However, the first time this order was used in Japanese was during the Heian period by Myōkaku, a priest and Sanskrit scholar of the 12th century, member of the same order of Kūkai and credited as reviving Saskrit studies. In 1695, a priest named Keichū published a 5 volume book that is considered to be fundamental in fixing the sound order to this day; and this work, in turn, was probably based on an earlier 3 volume systematic study of the grammar and the writing system of the Buddhist Hybrid Sanskrit, written by another priest, Kakugen, in 1681, also member of the order of Kūkai and Myōkaku.

However, hiragana and katakana did not quickly supplant man'yōgana. It was only in 1900 that the present set of kana was codified. All the other forms of hiragana and katakana developed before the 1900 codification are known as hentaigana (変体仮名, "variant kana"). Rules for their usage as per the spelling reforms of 1946, the gendai kana-zukai (現代仮名遣い, "present-day kana usage"), which abolished the kana for wi (ゐ・ヰ), we (ゑ・ヱ), and wo (を・ヲ) (except that the last was reserved as the accusative particle).

Identical man'yōgana roots of katakana and hiragana glyphs
	a	i	u	e	o	=:≠
–	≠	≠	=	≠	=	2:3
k	=	=	=	≠	=	4:1
s	≠	=	≠	=	=	3:2
t	≠	≠	=	=	=	3:2
n	=	=	=	=	=	5:0
h	≠	=	=	=	=	4:1
m	=	≠	≠	=	=	3:2
y	=		=		=	3:0
r	=	=	≠	=	=	4:1
w	=	≠		=	≠	2:2
n			≠			0:1
=:≠	6:4	5:4	6:4	7:2	9:1	33:15

== Collation ==
Kana are the basis for collation in Japanese. They are taken in the order given by the gojūon (あ い う え お ... わ を ん), though iroha (い ろ は に ほ へ と ... せ す (ん)) ordering is used for enumeration in some circumstances. Dictionaries differ in the sequence order for long/short vowel distinction, small tsu and diacritics. As Japanese does not use word spaces (except as a tool for children), there can be no word-by-word collation; all collation is kana-by-kana.

== Disadvantages ==
The use of Chinese characters in Japanese to avoid homophones is not due to the scarcity of phonemes in the language—Hawaiian and Rotokas have even fewer phonemes than Japanese, yet they work fine with phonetic scripts. The fundamental reason lies in the fact that kana are not entirely phonetic: for instance, they do not indicate pitch accents (アクセント). Both "chopsticks" (箸) and "bridge" (橋) are written as "はし" (hashi). In Kana, "chopsticks" (箸) is pronounced as "はし" with a high-low pitch pattern (háshi), while "bridge" (橋) is pronounced as "はし" with a low-high pitch pattern (hashí). When speaking, the meaning must be distinguished by tone. Additionally, Japanese kana (except for "ん") do not include pure consonants, which makes it impossible to directly represent consonant clusters when transliterating foreign words. Instead, vowels must be inserted. For example, the English loanword 'club' is transliterated into Japanese as クラブ (kurabu). Similarly, the name of the U.S. President Donald Trump is rendered as ドナルド・トランプ (Donarudo Toranpu).

== In Unicode ==
The hiragana range in Unicode is U+3040 ... U+309F, and the katakana range is U+30A0 ... U+30FF. The obsolete and rare characters (wi and we) also have their proper code points.

Hiragana^{[1]}^{[2]} Official Unicode Consortium code chart (PDF)
	0	1	2	3	4	5	6	7	8	9	A	B	C	D	E	F
U+304x		ぁ	あ	ぃ	い	ぅ	う	ぇ	え	ぉ	お	か	が	き	ぎ	く
U+305x	ぐ	け	げ	こ	ご	さ	ざ	し	じ	す	ず	せ	ぜ	そ	ぞ	た
U+306x	だ	ち	ぢ	っ	つ	づ	て	で	と	ど	な	に	ぬ	ね	の	は
U+307x	ば	ぱ	ひ	び	ぴ	ふ	ぶ	ぷ	へ	べ	ぺ	ほ	ぼ	ぽ	ま	み
U+308x	む	め	も	ゃ	や	ゅ	ゆ	ょ	よ	ら	り	る	れ	ろ	ゎ	わ
U+309x	ゐ	ゑ	を	ん	ゔ	ゕ	ゖ			゙	゚	゛	゜	ゝ	ゞ	ゟ
Notes 1.As of Unicode version 18.0 2.Grey areas indicate non-assigned code points

Katakana^{[1]} Official Unicode Consortium code chart (PDF)
	0	1	2	3	4	5	6	7	8	9	A	B	C	D	E	F
U+30Ax	゠	ァ	ア	ィ	イ	ゥ	ウ	ェ	エ	ォ	オ	カ	ガ	キ	ギ	ク
U+30Bx	グ	ケ	ゲ	コ	ゴ	サ	ザ	シ	ジ	ス	ズ	セ	ゼ	ソ	ゾ	タ
U+30Cx	ダ	チ	ヂ	ッ	ツ	ヅ	テ	デ	ト	ド	ナ	ニ	ヌ	ネ	ノ	ハ
U+30Dx	バ	パ	ヒ	ビ	ピ	フ	ブ	プ	ヘ	ベ	ペ	ホ	ボ	ポ	マ	ミ
U+30Ex	ム	メ	モ	ャ	ヤ	ュ	ユ	ョ	ヨ	ラ	リ	ル	レ	ロ	ヮ	ワ
U+30Fx	ヰ	ヱ	ヲ	ン	ヴ	ヵ	ヶ	ヷ	ヸ	ヹ	ヺ	・	ー	ヽ	ヾ	ヿ
Notes 1.As of Unicode version 18.0

Characters U+3095 and U+3096 are hiragana small ka and small ke, respectively. U+30F5 and U+30F6 are their katakana equivalents. Characters U+3099 and U+309A are combining dakuten and handakuten, which correspond to the spacing characters U+309B and U+309C. U+309D is the hiragana iteration mark, used to repeat a previous hiragana. U+309E is the voiced hiragana iteration mark, which stands in for the previous hiragana but with the consonant voiced (k becomes g, h becomes b, etc.). U+30FD and U+30FE are the katakana iteration marks. U+309F is a ligature of yori (より) sometimes used in vertical writing. U+30FF is a ligature of koto (コト), also found in vertical writing.

Additionally, there are halfwidth equivalents to the standard fullwidth katakana. These are encoded within the Halfwidth and Fullwidth Forms block (U+FF00–U+FFEF), starting at U+FF65 and ending at U+FF9F (characters U+FF61–U+FF64 are halfwidth punctuation marks):

Katakana subset of Halfwidth and Fullwidth Forms^{[1]} Official Unicode Consortium code chart (PDF)
	0	1	2	3	4	5	6	7	8	9	A	B	C	D	E	F
...	(U+FF00–U+FF64 omitted)															
U+FF6x						･	ｦ	ｧ	ｨ	ｩ	ｪ	ｫ	ｬ	ｭ	ｮ	ｯ
U+FF7x	ｰ	ｱ	ｲ	ｳ	ｴ	ｵ	ｶ	ｷ	ｸ	ｹ	ｺ	ｻ	ｼ	ｽ	ｾ	ｿ
U+FF8x	ﾀ	ﾁ	ﾂ	ﾃ	ﾄ	ﾅ	ﾆ	ﾇ	ﾈ	ﾉ	ﾊ	ﾋ	ﾌ	ﾍ	ﾎ	ﾏ
U+FF9x	ﾐ	ﾑ	ﾒ	ﾓ	ﾔ	ﾕ	ﾖ	ﾗ	ﾘ	ﾙ	ﾚ	ﾛ	ﾜ	ﾝ	ﾞ	ﾟ
...	(U+FFA0–U+FFEF omitted)															
Notes 1.As of Unicode version 18.0

There is also a small "Katakana Phonetic Extensions" range (U+31F0 ... U+31FF), which includes some additional small kana characters for writing the Ainu language. Further small kana characters are present in the "Small Kana Extension" block.

Katakana Phonetic Extensions^{[1]} Official Unicode Consortium code chart (PDF)
	0	1	2	3	4	5	6	7	8	9	A	B	C	D	E	F
U+31Fx	ㇰ	ㇱ	ㇲ	ㇳ	ㇴ	ㇵ	ㇶ	ㇷ	ㇸ	ㇹ	ㇺ	ㇻ	ㇼ	ㇽ	ㇾ	ㇿ
Notes 1.As of Unicode version 18.0

Small Kana Extension^{[1]}^{[2]} Official Unicode Consortium code chart (PDF)
	0	1	2	3	4	5	6	7	8	9	A	B	C	D	E	F
U+1B13x			𛄲													
U+1B14x																
U+1B15x	𛅐	𛅑	𛅒			𛅕										
U+1B16x					𛅤	𛅥	𛅦	𛅧	𛅨							
Notes 1.As of Unicode version 18.0 2.Grey areas indicate non-assigned code points

Unicode also includes "Katakana letter archaic E" (U+1B000), as well as 255 archaic Hiragana, in the Kana Supplement block. It also includes a further 31 archaic Hiragana in the Kana Extended-A block.

Kana Supplement^{[1]} Official Unicode Consortium code chart (PDF)
	0	1	2	3	4	5	6	7	8	9	A	B	C	D	E	F
U+1B00x	𛀀	𛀁	𛀂	𛀃	𛀄	𛀅	𛀆	𛀇	𛀈	𛀉	𛀊	𛀋	𛀌	𛀍	𛀎	𛀏
U+1B01x	𛀐	𛀑	𛀒	𛀓	𛀔	𛀕	𛀖	𛀗	𛀘	𛀙	𛀚	𛀛	𛀜	𛀝	𛀞	𛀟
U+1B02x	𛀠	𛀡	𛀢	𛀣	𛀤	𛀥	𛀦	𛀧	𛀨	𛀩	𛀪	𛀫	𛀬	𛀭	𛀮	𛀯
U+1B03x	𛀰	𛀱	𛀲	𛀳	𛀴	𛀵	𛀶	𛀷	𛀸	𛀹	𛀺	𛀻	𛀼	𛀽	𛀾	𛀿
U+1B04x	𛁀	𛁁	𛁂	𛁃	𛁄	𛁅	𛁆	𛁇	𛁈	𛁉	𛁊	𛁋	𛁌	𛁍	𛁎	𛁏
U+1B05x	𛁐	𛁑	𛁒	𛁓	𛁔	𛁕	𛁖	𛁗	𛁘	𛁙	𛁚	𛁛	𛁜	𛁝	𛁞	𛁟
U+1B06x	𛁠	𛁡	𛁢	𛁣	𛁤	𛁥	𛁦	𛁧	𛁨	𛁩	𛁪	𛁫	𛁬	𛁭	𛁮	𛁯
U+1B07x	𛁰	𛁱	𛁲	𛁳	𛁴	𛁵	𛁶	𛁷	𛁸	𛁹	𛁺	𛁻	𛁼	𛁽	𛁾	𛁿
U+1B08x	𛂀	𛂁	𛂂	𛂃	𛂄	𛂅	𛂆	𛂇	𛂈	𛂉	𛂊	𛂋	𛂌	𛂍	𛂎	𛂏
U+1B09x	𛂐	𛂑	𛂒	𛂓	𛂔	𛂕	𛂖	𛂗	𛂘	𛂙	𛂚	𛂛	𛂜	𛂝	𛂞	𛂟
U+1B0Ax	𛂠	𛂡	𛂢	𛂣	𛂤	𛂥	𛂦	𛂧	𛂨	𛂩	𛂪	𛂫	𛂬	𛂭	𛂮	𛂯
U+1B0Bx	𛂰	𛂱	𛂲	𛂳	𛂴	𛂵	𛂶	𛂷	𛂸	𛂹	𛂺	𛂻	𛂼	𛂽	𛂾	𛂿
U+1B0Cx	𛃀	𛃁	𛃂	𛃃	𛃄	𛃅	𛃆	𛃇	𛃈	𛃉	𛃊	𛃋	𛃌	𛃍	𛃎	𛃏
U+1B0Dx	𛃐	𛃑	𛃒	𛃓	𛃔	𛃕	𛃖	𛃗	𛃘	𛃙	𛃚	𛃛	𛃜	𛃝	𛃞	𛃟
U+1B0Ex	𛃠	𛃡	𛃢	𛃣	𛃤	𛃥	𛃦	𛃧	𛃨	𛃩	𛃪	𛃫	𛃬	𛃭	𛃮	𛃯
U+1B0Fx	𛃰	𛃱	𛃲	𛃳	𛃴	𛃵	𛃶	𛃷	𛃸	𛃹	𛃺	𛃻	𛃼	𛃽	𛃾	𛃿
Notes 1.As of Unicode version 18.0

Kana Extended-A^{[1]}^{[2]} Official Unicode Consortium code chart (PDF)
	0	1	2	3	4	5	6	7	8	9	A	B	C	D	E	F
U+1B10x	𛄀	𛄁	𛄂	𛄃	𛄄	𛄅	𛄆	𛄇	𛄈	𛄉	𛄊	𛄋	𛄌	𛄍	𛄎	𛄏
U+1B11x	𛄐	𛄑	𛄒	𛄓	𛄔	𛄕	𛄖	𛄗	𛄘	𛄙	𛄚	𛄛	𛄜	𛄝	𛄞	𛄟
U+1B12x	𛄠	𛄡	𛄢	𛄣	𛄤	𛄥	𛄦	𛄧	𛄨							
Notes 1.As of Unicode version 18.0 2.Grey areas indicate non-assigned code points

The Kana Extended-B block was added in September, 2021 with the release of version 14.0:

Kana Extended-B^{[1]}^{[2]} Official Unicode Consortium code chart (PDF)
	0	1	2	3	4	5	6	7	8	9	A	B	C	D	E	F
U+1AFFx	𚿰	𚿱	𚿲	𚿳		𚿵	𚿶	𚿷	𚿸	𚿹	𚿺	𚿻		𚿽	𚿾	
Notes 1.As of Unicode version 18.0 2.Grey areas indicate non-assigned code points

== See also ==
- Furigana
- Okurigana
- Yotsugana
- Gojūon
- Hentaigana
- Historical kana orthography
- Man'yōgana
- Romanization of Japanese
- Transliteration and Transcription (linguistics)
- Wabun code - a variant of Morse code for kana
