= Wabun code =

Japanese telegraphic code

- Language: Japanese (basic support)
- Classification: non-Latin Morse code for Kana
- Succeeded by: JIS C 0803 (JIS X 6001), JIS C 6220 (JIS X 0201)

Wabun code (和文モールス符号, wabun mōrusu fugō; Morse code for Japanese text) is a form of Morse code used to send the Japanese language in kana characters. Unlike International Morse Code, which represents letters of the Latin script, in Wabun each symbol represents a Japanese kana. For this reason, Wabun code is also sometimes called Kana code.

When Wabun code is intermixed with International Morse code, the prosign D̅O̅ ( ▄▄▄ ▄ ▄ ▄▄▄ ▄▄▄ ▄▄▄ ) is used to announce the beginning of Wabun, and the prosign S̅N̅ ( ▄ ▄ ▄ ▄▄▄ ▄ ) is used to announce the return to International Code.

== Wabun Code tree ==
- ▄
- ▄▄▄
  - ▄▄▄ ▄
    - ▄▄▄ ▄ ▄
      - ▄▄▄ ▄ ▄ ▄
      - ▄▄▄ ▄ ▄ ▄▄▄
    - ▄▄▄ ▄ ▄▄▄
      - ▄▄▄ ▄ ▄▄▄ ▄
        - ▄▄▄ ▄ ▄▄▄ ▄ ▄
        - ▄▄▄ ▄ ▄▄▄ ▄ ▄▄▄
      - ▄▄▄ ▄ ▄▄▄ ▄▄▄

== Chart ==
Kana in Iroha order.

| Mora | Code | ITU | Mora | Code | ITU | Mora | Code | ITU | Mora | Code | ITU |
| い i | ▄ ▄▄▄ | A | わ wa | ▄▄▄ ▄ ▄▄▄ | K | ゐ wi | ▄ ▄▄▄ ▄ ▄ ▄▄▄ | | さ sa | ▄▄▄ ▄ ▄▄▄ ▄ ▄▄▄ | |
| ろ ro | ▄ ▄▄▄ ▄ ▄▄▄ | | か ka | ▄ ▄▄▄ ▄ ▄ | L | の no | ▄ ▄ ▄▄▄ ▄▄▄ | | き ki | ▄▄▄ ▄ ▄▄▄ ▄ ▄ | |
| は ha | ▄▄▄ ▄ ▄ ▄ | B | よ yo | ▄▄▄ ▄▄▄ | M | お o | ▄ ▄▄▄ ▄ ▄ ▄ | & | ゆ yu | ▄▄▄ ▄ ▄ ▄▄▄ ▄▄▄ | |
| に ni | ▄▄▄ ▄ ▄▄▄ ▄ | C | た ta | ▄▄▄ ▄ | N | く ku | ▄ ▄ ▄ ▄▄▄ | V | め me | ▄▄▄ ▄ ▄ ▄ ▄▄▄ | = |
| ほ ho | ▄▄▄ ▄ ▄ | D | れ re | ▄▄▄ ▄▄▄ ▄▄▄ | O | や ya | ▄ ▄▄▄ ▄▄▄ | W | み mi | ▄ ▄ ▄▄▄ ▄ ▄▄▄ | |
| へ he | ▄ | E | そ so | ▄▄▄ ▄▄▄ ▄▄▄ ▄ | | ま ma | ▄▄▄ ▄ ▄ ▄▄▄ | X | し shi | ▄▄▄ ▄▄▄ ▄ ▄▄▄ ▄ | |
| と to | ▄ ▄ ▄▄▄ ▄ ▄ | É | つ tsu | ▄ ▄▄▄ ▄▄▄ ▄ | P | け ke | ▄▄▄ ▄ ▄▄▄ ▄▄▄ | Y | ゑ we | ▄ ▄▄▄ ▄▄▄ ▄ ▄ | |
| ち chi | ▄ ▄ ▄▄▄ ▄ | F | ね ne | ▄▄▄ ▄▄▄ ▄ ▄▄▄ | Q | ふ fu | ▄▄▄ ▄▄▄ ▄ ▄ | Z | ひ hi | ▄▄▄ ▄▄▄ ▄ ▄ ▄▄▄ | |
| り ri | ▄▄▄ ▄▄▄ ▄ | G | な na | ▄ ▄▄▄ ▄ | R | こ ko | ▄▄▄ ▄▄▄ ▄▄▄ ▄▄▄ | | も mo | ▄▄▄ ▄ ▄ ▄▄▄ ▄ | / |
| ぬ nu | ▄ ▄ ▄ ▄ | H | ら ra | ▄ ▄ ▄ | S | え e | ▄▄▄ ▄ ▄▄▄ ▄▄▄ ▄▄▄ | | せ se | ▄ ▄▄▄ ▄▄▄ ▄▄▄ ▄ | |
| る ru | ▄▄▄ ▄ ▄▄▄ ▄▄▄ ▄ | ( | む mu | ▄▄▄ | T | て te | ▄ ▄▄▄ ▄ ▄▄▄ ▄▄▄ | | す su | ▄▄▄ ▄▄▄ ▄▄▄ ▄ ▄▄▄ | |
| を wo | ▄ ▄▄▄ ▄▄▄ ▄▄▄ | J | う u | ▄ ▄ ▄▄▄ | U | あ a | ▄▄▄ ▄▄▄ ▄ ▄▄▄ ▄▄▄ | | ん n | ▄ ▄▄▄ ▄ ▄▄▄ ▄ | + |

| Punctuation | | Code | ITU |
|---|---|---|---|
| ◌゛ | Dakuten | ▄ ▄ | I |
| ◌゜ | Handakuten | ▄ ▄ ▄▄▄ ▄▄▄ ▄ | |
| ー | Chōonpu | ▄ ▄▄▄ ▄▄▄ ▄ ▄▄▄ | |
| 、 | Comma | ▄ ▄▄▄ ▄ ▄▄▄ ▄ ▄▄▄ | . |
| 。 | Full stop | ▄ ▄▄▄ ▄ ▄▄▄ ▄ ▄ | |
| ( | Left parenthesis | ▄▄▄ ▄ ▄▄▄ ▄▄▄ ▄ ▄▄▄ | ) |
| ) | Right parenthesis | ▄ ▄▄▄ ▄ ▄ ▄▄▄ ▄ | " |

== Expanded chart ==
Katakana syllabograms
| | Monographs (gojūon) | | | | | Digraphs (yōon) | | |
| | a | i | u | e | o | ya | yu | yo |
|---|---|---|---|---|---|---|---|---|
| ∅ | ア a ▄▄▄ ▄▄▄ ▄ ▄▄▄ ▄▄▄ | イ i ▄ ▄▄▄ | ウ u ▄ ▄ ▄▄▄ | エ e ▄▄▄ ▄ ▄▄▄ ▄▄▄ ▄▄▄ | オ o ▄ ▄▄▄ ▄ ▄ ▄ | | | |
| K | カ ka ▄ ▄▄▄ ▄ ▄ | キ ki ▄▄▄ ▄ ▄▄▄ ▄ ▄ | ク ku ▄ ▄ ▄ ▄▄▄ | ケ ke ▄▄▄ ▄ ▄▄▄ ▄▄▄ | コ ko ▄▄▄ ▄▄▄ ▄▄▄ ▄▄▄ | キャ kya ▄▄▄ ▄ ▄▄▄ ▄ ▄ ▄ ▄▄▄ ▄▄▄ | キュ kyu ▄▄▄ ▄ ▄▄▄ ▄ ▄ ▄▄▄ ▄ ▄ ▄▄▄ ▄▄▄ | キョ kyo ▄▄▄ ▄ ▄▄▄ ▄ ▄ ▄▄▄ ▄▄▄ |
| S | サ sa ▄▄▄ ▄ ▄▄▄ ▄ ▄▄▄ | シ shi ▄▄▄ ▄▄▄ ▄ ▄▄▄ ▄ | ス su ▄▄▄ ▄▄▄ ▄▄▄ ▄ ▄▄▄ | セ se ▄ ▄▄▄ ▄▄▄ ▄▄▄ ▄ | ソ so ▄▄▄ ▄▄▄ ▄▄▄ ▄ | シャ sha ▄▄▄ ▄▄▄ ▄ ▄▄▄ ▄ ▄ ▄▄▄ ▄▄▄ | シュ shu ▄▄▄ ▄▄▄ ▄ ▄▄▄ ▄ ▄▄▄ ▄ ▄ ▄▄▄ ▄▄▄ | ショ sho ▄▄▄ ▄▄▄ ▄ ▄▄▄ ▄ ▄▄▄ ▄▄▄ |
| T | タ ta ▄▄▄ ▄ | チ chi ▄ ▄ ▄▄▄ ▄ | ツ tsu ▄ ▄▄▄ ▄▄▄ ▄ | テ te ▄ ▄▄▄ ▄ ▄▄▄ ▄▄▄ | ト to ▄ ▄ ▄▄▄ ▄ ▄ | チャ cha ▄ ▄ ▄▄▄ ▄ ▄ ▄▄▄ ▄▄▄ | チュ chu ▄ ▄ ▄▄▄ ▄ ▄▄▄ ▄ ▄ ▄▄▄ ▄▄▄ | チョ cho ▄ ▄ ▄▄▄ ▄ ▄▄▄ ▄▄▄ |
| N | ナ na ▄ ▄▄▄ ▄ | ニ ni ▄▄▄ ▄ ▄▄▄ ▄ | ヌ nu ▄ ▄ ▄ ▄ | ネ ne ▄▄▄ ▄▄▄ ▄ ▄▄▄ | ノ no ▄ ▄ ▄▄▄ ▄▄▄ | ニャ nya ▄▄▄ ▄ ▄▄▄ ▄ ▄ ▄▄▄ ▄▄▄ | ニュ nyu ▄▄▄ ▄ ▄▄▄ ▄ ▄▄▄ ▄ ▄ ▄▄▄ ▄▄▄ | ニョ nyo ▄▄▄ ▄ ▄▄▄ ▄ ▄▄▄ ▄▄▄ |
| H | ハ ha ▄▄▄ ▄ ▄ ▄ | ヒ hi ▄▄▄ ▄▄▄ ▄ ▄ ▄▄▄ | フ fu ▄▄▄ ▄▄▄ ▄ ▄ | ヘ he ▄ | ホ ho ▄▄▄ ▄ ▄ | ヒャ hya ▄▄▄ ▄▄▄ ▄ ▄ ▄▄▄ ▄ ▄▄▄ ▄▄▄ | ヒュ hyu ▄▄▄ ▄▄▄ ▄ ▄ ▄▄▄ ▄▄▄ ▄ ▄ ▄▄▄ ▄▄▄ | ヒョ hyo ▄▄▄ ▄▄▄ ▄ ▄ ▄▄▄ ▄▄▄ ▄▄▄ |
| M | マ ma ▄▄▄ ▄ ▄ ▄▄▄ | ミ mi ▄ ▄ ▄▄▄ ▄ ▄▄▄ | ム mu ▄▄▄ | メ me ▄▄▄ ▄ ▄ ▄ ▄▄▄ | モ mo ▄▄▄ ▄ ▄ ▄▄▄ ▄ | ミャ mya ▄ ▄ ▄▄▄ ▄ ▄▄▄ ▄ ▄▄▄ ▄▄▄ | ミュ myu ▄ ▄ ▄▄▄ ▄ ▄▄▄ ▄▄▄ ▄ ▄ ▄▄▄ ▄▄▄ | ミョ myo ▄ ▄ ▄▄▄ ▄ ▄▄▄ ▄▄▄ ▄▄▄ |
| Y | ヤ ya ▄ ▄▄▄ ▄▄▄ | | ユ yu ▄▄▄ ▄ ▄ ▄▄▄ ▄▄▄ | | ヨ yo ▄▄▄ ▄▄▄ | | | |
| R | ラ ra ▄ ▄ ▄ | リ ri ▄▄▄ ▄▄▄ ▄ | ル ru ▄▄▄ ▄ ▄▄▄ ▄▄▄ ▄ | レ re ▄▄▄ ▄▄▄ ▄▄▄ | ロ ro ▄ ▄▄▄ ▄ ▄▄▄ | リャ rya ▄▄▄ ▄▄▄ ▄ ▄ ▄▄▄ ▄▄▄ | リュ ryu ▄▄▄ ▄▄▄ ▄ ▄▄▄ ▄ ▄ ▄▄▄ ▄▄▄ | リョ ryo ▄▄▄ ▄▄▄ ▄ ▄▄▄ ▄▄▄ |
| W | ワ wa ▄▄▄ ▄ ▄▄▄ | ヰ (wi) ▄ ▄▄▄ ▄ ▄ ▄▄▄ | | ヱ (we) ▄ ▄▄▄ ▄▄▄ ▄ ▄ | ヲ wo ▄ ▄▄▄ ▄▄▄ ▄▄▄ | | | |
| * | ン n ▄ ▄▄▄ ▄ ▄▄▄ ▄ | 、 Comma ▄ ▄▄▄ ▄ ▄▄▄ ▄ ▄▄▄ | | 。 Full stop ▄ ▄▄▄ ▄ ▄▄▄ ▄ ▄ | | Dakuten ◌゛ Diacritic ▄ ▄ | Handakuten ◌゜ Diacritic ▄ ▄ ▄▄▄ ▄▄▄ ▄ | Chōonpu ー Long Vowel ▄ ▄▄▄ ▄▄▄ ▄ ▄▄▄ |
| | Monographs with diacritics (gojūon with dakuten) | | | | | Digraphs with diacritics (yōon with dakuten) | | |
| | a | i | u | e | o | ya | yu | yo |
| G (K) | ガ ga ▄ ▄▄▄ ▄ ▄ ▄ ▄ | ギ gi ▄▄▄ ▄ ▄▄▄ ▄ ▄ ▄ ▄ | グ gu ▄ ▄ ▄ ▄▄▄ ▄ ▄ | ゲ ge ▄▄▄ ▄ ▄▄▄ ▄▄▄ ▄ ▄ | ゴ go ▄▄▄ ▄▄▄ ▄▄▄ ▄▄▄ ▄ ▄ | ギャ gya ▄▄▄ ▄ ▄▄▄ ▄ ▄ ▄ ▄ ▄ ▄▄▄ ▄▄▄ | ギュ gyu ▄▄▄ ▄ ▄▄▄ ▄ ▄ ▄ ▄ ▄▄▄ ▄ ▄ ▄▄▄ ▄▄▄ | ギョ gyo ▄▄▄ ▄ ▄▄▄ ▄ ▄ ▄ ▄ ▄▄▄ ▄▄▄ |
| Z (S) | ザ za ▄▄▄ ▄ ▄▄▄ ▄ ▄▄▄ ▄ ▄ | ジ ji ▄▄▄ ▄▄▄ ▄ ▄▄▄ ▄ ▄ ▄ | ズ zu ▄▄▄ ▄▄▄ ▄▄▄ ▄ ▄▄▄ ▄ ▄ | ゼ ze ▄ ▄▄▄ ▄▄▄ ▄▄▄ ▄ ▄ ▄ | ゾ zo ▄▄▄ ▄▄▄ ▄▄▄ ▄ ▄ ▄ | ジャ ja ▄▄▄ ▄▄▄ ▄ ▄▄▄ ▄ ▄ ▄ ▄ ▄▄▄ ▄▄▄ | ジュ ju ▄▄▄ ▄▄▄ ▄ ▄▄▄ ▄ ▄ ▄ ▄▄▄ ▄ ▄ ▄▄▄ ▄▄▄ | ジョ jo ▄▄▄ ▄▄▄ ▄ ▄▄▄ ▄ ▄ ▄ ▄▄▄ ▄▄▄ |
| D (T) | ダ da ▄▄▄ ▄ ▄ ▄ | ヂ dji ▄ ▄ ▄▄▄ ▄ ▄ ▄ | ヅ dzu ▄ ▄▄▄ ▄▄▄ ▄ ▄ ▄ | デ de ▄ ▄▄▄ ▄ ▄▄▄ ▄▄▄ ▄ ▄ | ド do ▄ ▄ ▄▄▄ ▄ ▄ ▄ ▄ | ヂャ dja ▄ ▄ ▄▄▄ ▄ ▄ ▄ ▄ ▄▄▄ ▄▄▄ | ヂュ dju ▄ ▄ ▄▄▄ ▄ ▄ ▄ ▄▄▄ ▄ ▄ ▄▄▄ ▄▄▄ | ヂョ djo ▄ ▄ ▄▄▄ ▄ ▄ ▄ ▄▄▄ ▄▄▄ |
| B (H) | バ ba ▄▄▄ ▄ ▄ ▄ ▄ ▄ | ビ bi ▄▄▄ ▄▄▄ ▄ ▄ ▄▄▄ ▄ ▄ | ブ bu ▄▄▄ ▄▄▄ ▄ ▄ ▄ ▄ | ベ be ▄ ▄ ▄ | ボ bo ▄▄▄ ▄ ▄ ▄ ▄ | ビャ bya ▄▄▄ ▄▄▄ ▄ ▄ ▄▄▄ ▄ ▄ ▄ ▄▄▄ ▄▄▄ | ビュ byu ▄▄▄ ▄▄▄ ▄ ▄ ▄▄▄ ▄ ▄ ▄▄▄ ▄ ▄ ▄▄▄ ▄▄▄ | ビョ byo ▄▄▄ ▄▄▄ ▄ ▄ ▄▄▄ ▄ ▄ ▄▄▄ ▄▄▄ |
| | Monographs with diacritics (gojūon with handakuten) | | | | | Digraphs with diacritics (yōon with handakuten) | | |
| | a | i | u | e | o | ya | yu | yo |
| P (H) | パ pa ▄▄▄ ▄ ▄ ▄ ▄ ▄ ▄▄▄ ▄▄▄ ▄ | ピ pi ▄▄▄ ▄▄▄ ▄ ▄ ▄▄▄ ▄ ▄ ▄▄▄ ▄▄▄ ▄ | プ pu ▄▄▄ ▄▄▄ ▄ ▄ ▄ ▄ ▄▄▄ ▄▄▄ ▄ | ペ pe ▄ ▄ ▄ ▄▄▄ ▄▄▄ ▄ | ポ po ▄▄▄ ▄ ▄ ▄ ▄ ▄▄▄ ▄▄▄ ▄ | ピャ pya ▄▄▄ ▄▄▄ ▄ ▄ ▄▄▄ ▄ ▄ ▄▄▄ ▄▄▄ ▄ ▄ ▄▄▄ ▄▄▄ | ピュ pyu ▄▄▄ ▄▄▄ ▄ ▄ ▄▄▄ ▄ ▄ ▄▄▄ ▄▄▄ ▄ ▄▄▄ ▄ ▄ ▄▄▄ ▄▄▄ | ピョ pyo ▄▄▄ ▄▄▄ ▄ ▄ ▄▄▄ ▄ ▄ ▄▄▄ ▄▄▄ ▄ ▄▄▄ ▄▄▄ |

== See also ==
- Tap code
