= No (kana) =

no

Hiragana	Katakana
- Transliteration: no
- Hiragana origin: 乃
- Katakana origin: 乃
- Man'yōgana: 努 怒 野 乃 能 笑 荷
- Spelling kana: 野原のノ (Nohara no no)
- Unicode: U+306E, U+30CE
- Braille: ⠎
- Note: These Man'yōgana originally represented morae with one of two different vowel sounds, which merged in later pronunciation.

No (hiragana: の, katakana: ノ) are Japanese kana, both representing one mora. In the gojūon system of ordering of Japanese morae, it occupies the 25th position, between ね (ne) and は (ha). It occupies the 26th position in the iroha ordering. Both represent the sound [no]. The katakana form is written similar to the Kangxi radical 丿, radical 4.

Form	Rōmaji	Hiragana	Katakana
Normal n- (な行 na-gyō)	no	の	ノ
Normal n- (な行 na-gyō)	nou noo nō	のう, のぅ のお, のぉ のー	ノウ, ノゥ ノオ, ノォ ノー

== Stroke order ==
Stroke order in writing の

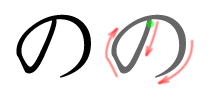

Stroke order in writing ノ

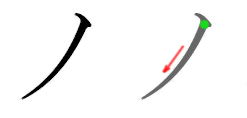

To write の, begin slightly above the center, stroke downward diagonally, then round upward and continue curve around, leaving a small gap at the bottom. To write ノ, simply do a swooping curve from top-right to bottom left.

== Other communicative representations ==
Japanese radiotelephony alphabet	Wabun code
野原のノ; Nohara no "No"	▄ ▄ ▄▄▄ ▄▄▄

Japanese Navy Signal Flag

Japanese semaphore
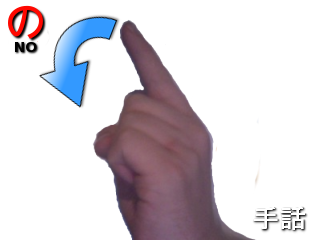
Japanese manual syllabary (fingerspelling)
Braille dots-234
Japanese Braille

=== Braille forms ===
の / ノ in Japanese Braille
の / ノ no	のう / ノー nō/nou	Other kana based on Braille の	
の / ノ no	のう / ノー nō/nou	にょ / ニョ nyo	にょう / ニョー nyō/nyou
⠎ (braille pattern dots-234)	⠎ (braille pattern dots-234) ⠒ (braille pattern dots-25)	⠈ (braille pattern dots-4) ⠎ (braille pattern dots-234)	⠈ (braille pattern dots-4) ⠎ (braille pattern dots-234) ⠒ (braille pattern dots-25)

=== Computer encodings ===
Character information
Preview	の		ノ		ﾉ		㋨	
Unicode name	HIRAGANA LETTER NO		KATAKANA LETTER NO		HALFWIDTH KATAKANA LETTER NO		CIRCLED KATAKANA NO	
Encodings	decimal	hex	dec	hex	dec	hex	dec	hex
Unicode	12398	U+306E	12494	U+30CE	65417	U+FF89	13032	U+32E8
UTF-8	227 129 174	E3 81 AE	227 131 142	E3 83 8E	239 190 137	EF BE 89	227 139 168	E3 8B A8
Numeric character reference	&#12398;	&#x306E;	&#12494;	&#x30CE;	&#65417;	&#xFF89;	&#13032;	&#x32E8;
Shift JIS	130 204	82 CC	131 109	83 6D	201	C9		
EUC-JP	164 206	A4 CE	165 206	A5 CE	142 201	8E C9		
GB 18030	164 206	A4 CE	165 206	A5 CE	132 49 153 55	84 31 99 37		
EUC-KR / UHC	170 206	AA CE	171 206	AB CE				
Big5 (non-ETEN kana)	198 210	C6 D2	199 102	C7 66				
Big5 (ETEN / HKSCS)	199 85	C7 55	199 202	C7 CA				

== History ==
The leftmost, predominantly vertical segment of the man'yōgana was used to create the katakana ノ.

When the kanji 乃 is written in the highly cursive, flowing grass script style, it begins to resemble the hiragana の.

Hentaigana and gyaru-moji variant kana forms of no can also be found.

== Usage ==
の is a dental nasal consonant, articulated on the upper teeth, combined with a close-mid back rounded vowel to form one mora.

In the Japanese language, as well as forming words, の may be a particle showing possession. For example, the phrase "わたしのでんわ" watashi no denwa means "my telephone".

=== In Chinese ===
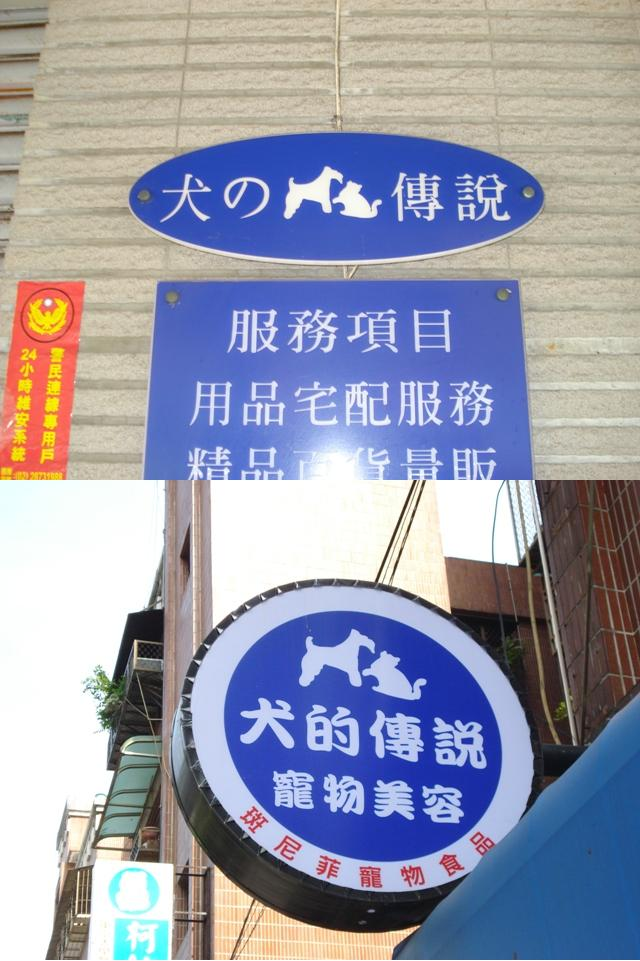
Usage of の in place of 的 (and 犬 in place of 狗) in Taipei

の has also proliferated on signs and labels in the Chinese-speaking world. It is used in place of the Modern Chinese possessive marker 的 de or Classical Chinese possessive marker 之 zhī, and の is pronounced in the same way as the Chinese character it replaces. This is usually done to "stand out" or to give an "exotic/Japanese feel", e.g. in commercial brand names, such as the fruit juice brand 鲜の每日C, where the の can be read as both 之 zhī, the possessive marker, and as 汁 zhī, meaning "juice". In Hong Kong, the Companies Registry has extended official recognition to this practice, and permits の to be used in Chinese names of registered businesses; it is thus the only non-Chinese symbol to be granted this treatment (aside from punctuation marks with no pronunciation value).
