= Dakuten and handakuten =

Japanese diacritic signs

◌゙ ◌゚o

Dakuten and handakuten
- Combining characters; U+3099 ◌゙ COMBINING KATAKANA-HIRAGANA VOICED SOUND MARK; U+309A ◌゚ COMBINING KATAKANA-HIRAGANA SEMI-VOICED SOUND MARK; Stand-alone characters; U+309B ゛ KATAKANA-HIRAGANA VOICED SOUND MARK; U+309C ゜ KATAKANA-HIRAGANA SEMI-VOICED SOUND MARK; U+FF9E ﾞ HALFWIDTH KATAKANA VOICED SOUND MARK; U+FF9F ﾟ HALFWIDTH KATAKANA SEMI-VOICED SOUND MARK

The dakuten (Japanese: 濁点; Japanese pronunciation: [dä̀.kɯ̥̈.té̞ɴ̀, -.té̞ɴ́],) voicing mark, lit. 'muddying (Note: Often interpreted or idiomatically translated as voiced, the metaphor is used to juxtapose or describe the syllable as a "muddier" sound) mark', colloquially ten-ten (点々, 'dots'), is a diacritic most often used in the Japanese kana syllabaries to indicate that the consonant of a mora should be pronounced as voiced — for instance, on sounds that have undergone rendaku (sequential voicing).

The handakuten (半濁点; [hä̀ń.dä́.kɯ̥̈.tè̞ɴ̀, hä́ń.-], lit. 'semi-muddying mark'), colloquially maru (丸, 'circle'), is a diacritic used with kana for moras pronounced with /h/ or /f/ to indicate that they should instead be pronounced with /p/.

== Glyphs ==
The dakuten resembles a quotation mark, while the handakuten is a small circle, similar to a degree sign, both placed at the top right corner of a kana character:

- U+3099 ◌゙ COMBINING KATAKANA-HIRAGANA VOICED SOUND MARK
- U+309A ◌゚ COMBINING KATAKANA-HIRAGANA SEMI-VOICED SOUND MARK
- U+309B ゛ KATAKANA-HIRAGANA VOICED SOUND MARK
- U+309C ゜ KATAKANA-HIRAGANA SEMI-VOICED SOUND MARK
- U+FF9E ﾞ HALFWIDTH KATAKANA VOICED SOUND MARK
- U+FF9F ﾟ HALFWIDTH KATAKANA SEMI-VOICED SOUND MARK

Both the dakuten and handakuten glyphs are written identically in hiragana and katakana scripts. The combining characters are rarely used in full-width Japanese characters, as Unicode and all common multibyte Japanese encodings provide precomposed glyphs for all possible dakuten and handakuten character combinations in the standard hiragana and katakana ranges. However, combining characters is required in half-width kana, which does not provide any precomposed characters in order to fit within a single byte.

The similarity between the dakuten and quotation marks (") is not an issue, since written Japanese uses corner brackets (「」).

== Phonetic shifts ==
The following table summarizes the phonetic shifts indicated by the dakuten and handakuten. Literally moras with dakuten are 'muddy sounds' (濁音, dakuon), while those without are 'clear sounds' (清音, seion). However, the handakuten (lit. 'half-muddy mark') does not follow this pattern.

None	Dakuten	Handakuten
か ka	が ga	か゚ nga
さ sa	ざ za	None
た ta	だ da	None
は ha	ば ba	ぱ pa
ら ra	None	ら゚ la
わ wa	わ゙ va	None

(Yellow shading indicates non-standard use.)

Handakuten on ka, ki, ku, ke, ko (rendered as か゚, き゚, く゚, け゚, こ゚/カ゚, キ゚, ク゚, ケ゚, コ゚) represent the sound of ng in singing ([ŋ]), which is an allophone of /ɡ/ in many dialects of Japanese. They are not used in normal Japanese writing but may be used by linguists and in dictionaries (or to represent characters in fiction who speak that way). This is called bidakuon (鼻濁音; 'nasal muddy sound'). Another rare application of handakuten is on the r-series, to mark them explicitly as l: ラ゚ /la/ and so forth (ら゚, り゚, る゚, れ゚, ろ゚/ラ゚, リ゚, ル゚, レ゚, ロ゚). This is only done in technical or pedantic contexts, as many Japanese speakers cannot tell the difference between r and l. Additionally linguists sometimes use ウ゚ to represent /ɴ/ in cases when a speaker pronounces う at the beginning of a word as a moraic nasal.

In katakana only, the dakuten may also be added to the character ウ u and a small vowel character to create a [v] sound, as in ヴァ va. However, a hiragana version of this character also exists with somewhat sporadic compatibility across platforms (ゔ). As /v/ does not exist in Japanese, this usage applies only to some modern loanwords and remains relatively uncommon — e.g., Venus is typically transliterated as ビーナス (bīnasu) instead of ヴィーナス (vīnasu). Japanese speakers, however, pronounce both the same, with [b] or [β], an occasional allophone of intervocalic /b/.

An even less common method is to add dakuten to the w-series, reviving the mostly obsolete characters for /wi/ (ヰ) and /we/ (ヱ). /vu/ is represented by using /u/, as above; /wo/ becomes /vo/ despite its /w/ normally being silent. Precomposed characters exist for this method as well (/va/ ヷ /vi/ ヸ /vu/ ヴ /ve/ ヹ /vo/ ヺ), although most IMEs do not have a convenient way to enter them.

In Ainu texts handakuten can be used with the katakana セ to make it a /t͡s/ sound, セ゚ ce [t͡se] (which is interchangeable with ツェ), and is used with small fu to represent a final p, ㇷ゚. In addition, handakuten can be combined with either katakana ツ or ト (tsu and to) to make a [tu̜] sound, ツ゚ or ト゚.

In Miyakoan, handakuten can be used with イ (normally [i]) to represent the vowel [ɨ].

In informal writing, dakuten is occasionally used on vowels to indicate a shocked or strangled articulation — for example, on あ゙ or ゔ. Dakuten can also be occasionally used with ん (ん゙) to indicate a guttural hum, growl, or similar sound.

=== Kana iteration marks ===
The dakuten can also be added to hiragana and katakana iteration marks, indicating that the previous kana is repeated with voicing:

Type	None	Dakuten	Handakuten
Hiragana	ゝ	ゞ	ゝ゚
Katakana	ヽ	ヾ	ヽ゚

Both signs are relatively rare but can occasionally be found in personal names such as Misuzu (みすゞ) or brand names such as Isuzu (いすゞ). In these cases the pronunciation is identical to writing the kana out in full. A longer, multi-character iteration mark called the kunojiten (〱), only used in vertical writing, may also have a dakuten added (〲) or a handakuten added (〱゚).

== Other communicative representations ==
- Representations of Dakuten

Japanese radiotelephony alphabet	Wabun code
に濁点 ni "Dakuten"*	▄ ▄

Japanese Navy Signal Flag	Japanese semaphore	Japanese manual syllabary (fingerspelling)	Braille dots-5 Japanese Braille

- Representations of Handakuten

Japanese radiotelephony alphabet	Wabun code
に半濁点 ni "Handakuten"*	▄ ▄ ▄▄▄ ▄▄▄ ▄

Japanese Navy Signal Flag	Japanese semaphore	Japanese manual syllabary (fingerspelling)	Braille dots-6 Japanese Braille

* Voiced morae and semi-voiced morae do not have independent names in radiotelephony and are signified by the unvoiced name followed by "ni dakuten" or "ni handakuten".

- Full Braille representation

Braille
Dakuten	Handakuten	Yōon + Dakuten	Yōon + Handakuten	Dakuten + Handakuten	Yōon + Dakuten + Handakuten
⠐ (braille pattern dots-5)	⠠ (braille pattern dots-6)	⠘ (braille pattern dots-45)	⠨ (braille pattern dots-46)	⠰ (braille pattern dots-56)	⠸ (braille pattern dots-456)

== Origins ==
The kun'yomi pronunciation of the character 濁 (daku in on'yomi) is nigori; hence the dakuten may also be called the nigori-ten. This character, meaning "muddy", stems from historical Chinese phonology where consonants were traditionally classified as "fully clear" (全清, voiceless unaspirated obstruent), "partly clear" (次清, voiceless aspirated obstruent), "fully muddy" (全濁, voiced obstruent), and "partly muddy" (次濁, voiced sonorant) (see Middle Chinese § Initials and w:zh:清濁音). Unlike in Chinese where "clear" and "muddy" were phonological, in Japanese these terms are purely orthographic: a "muddy sound" (濁音, dakuon) is simply a kana with a "muddy mark" or a dakuten; a "partly clear" (次清音, jiseion) or "half muddy sound" (半濁音, handakuon) is simply a kana with a "half muddy mark" or a handakuten; a "clear sound" (清音, seion) is any other kana without either of these marks. In fact the "partly clear/half muddy" consonant /p/ in Japanese would be considered "fully clear" in Chinese, while "clear" Japanese consonants such as /m/, /n/, /ɾ/, /j/, and /w/ would be "partly muddy" in Chinese. Meiji-era descriptions of the Japanese "sound" system (either the actual phonology or the orthography) in terms of "clear" and "muddy" always referenced the kana spelling and the two diacritics dakuten and handakuten. There is a distinction between "base muddiness" (本濁, hondaku), where a morpheme inherently contains a voiced consonant (as in the Sino-Japanese morpheme ga (我)), and "new muddiness" (新濁, shindaku), where a morpheme loses its original voiceless consonant and gains a voiced counterpart through rendaku (as in kao (顔) → asagao (朝顔)).

The earliest attested use of "muddy" diacritics was from the late ninth century. One of such diacritics was a superscript version of the radical 氵 from the "muddy" character 濁, as in 婆^{氵} (ba rather than pa). The modern dakuten appears to have come from Chinese tone diacritics. In some documents one dot marked pitch on a "clear sound," while two dots marked pitch on a "muddy sound." Another source was the Siddhaṃ nasality diacritic anusvāra through Buddhist sources. In Japanese writing it was adapted into a dot placed at the top-right corner of a character to denote the "muddiness" or nasality of consonants, as well as of the nasalized vowels /ĩ/ and /ũ/ adapted from the Chinese /ŋ/. The use of the anusvāra suggests prenasalization in early voiced consonants.

The handakuten is an innovation by Portuguese Jesuits, who first used it in the Rakuyōshū, to accurately transcribe the consonant /p/ and its lenited form /f/, which had not been distinguished in domestic writing.

== See also ==
- Tsu (kana)
- Sokuon
- Dagesh (Hebrew diacritic)

== Bibliography ==
- Frellesvig, Bjarke (2010). A History of the Japanese Language. Cambridge: Cambridge University Press. ISBN 978-0-521-65320-6.
