= Japanese manual syllabary =

Manual syllabary

The Japanese Sign Language syllabary (指文字, yubimoji; literally "finger letters") is a system of manual kana used as part of Japanese Sign Language (JSL). It is a signary of 45 signs and 4 diacritics representing the phonetic syllables of the Japanese language. Signs are distinguished both in the direction they point, and in whether the palm faces the viewer or the signer. For example, the manual syllables na, ni, ha are all made with the first two fingers of the hand extended straight, but for na the fingers point down, for ni across the body, and for ha toward the viewer. The signs for te and ho are both an open flat hand, but in te the palm faces the viewer, and in ho it faces away.

Although a syllabary rather than an alphabet, manual kana is based on the manual alphabet of American Sign Language. The simple vowels a, i, u, e, o are nearly identical to the ASL vowels, while the ASL consonants k, s, t, n, h, m, y, r, w are used for the corresponding syllables ending in the vowel a in manual kana: ka, sa, ta, na, ha, ma, ya, ra, wa. The sole exceptions are ma, na, and ta, the latter having been modified because the ASL letter t is an obscene gesture in Japan.

The other 31 manual kana are taken from a variety of sources. The signs for ko, su, tu (tsu), ni, hu (fu), he, ru, re, ro imitate the shapes of the katakana for those syllables. The signs for no, ri, n trace the way those katakana are written, just as j and z do in ASL. The signs hi, mi, yo, mu, shi, ku, ti (chi) are slight modifications of the numerals 1 hito, 3 mi, 4 yo, 6 mu, 7 shichi, 9 ku, 1000 ti. The syllable yu represents the symbol for 'hot water' (yu) displayed at public bath houses. Other symbols are taken from words in Japanese Sign Language, or common gestures used by the hearing in Japan, that represent words starting with that syllable in Japanese: se from JSL "back, spine" (Japanese se); so from "that" (sore); ki from "fox" (kitsune); ke from "fault" (ketten), or perhaps "hair" (ke); te from "hand" (te); to from "together with" (to); nu from "to steal" (nusumu); ne from "roots" (ne); ho from "sail" (ho); me from "eye" (me), mo from "of course" (mochiron).

These signs may be modified to reflect the diacritics used in written kana. All the modifications involve adding an element of motion to the sign. The dakuten or ten ten, which represents voicing, becomes a sideways motion; the handakuten or maru, used for the consonant p, moves upwards, small kana and silent w move inwards, and long vowels move downwards.

That is, the voiced consonants are produced by moving the sign for the syllable with the corresponding unvoiced consonant to the side. (That is, to the right if signing with the right hand.) The manual kana ga, gi, gu, ge, go are derived this way from ka, ki, ku, ke, ko; likewise, those starting with z, d, b are derived from the s, t, h kana. The p kana are derived from the h kana by moving them upwards. The long vowel in kō (indicated in katakana by a long line) is shown by moving the sign ko downward. In written kana, a consonant cluster involving y or w is indicated by writing the second kana smaller than the first; a geminate consonant by writing a small tu for the first segment. In foreign borrowings, vowels may also be written small. In manual kana, this is indicated by drawing the kana that would be written small in writing (the ya, yu, yo, wa, tu, etc.) inwards, toward the body. This motion is also used to derive the kana wi, we, wo (now pronounced i, e, o) from the kana i, e, o.

== The Yubimoji ==
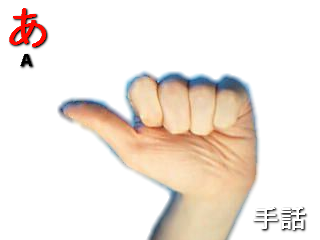
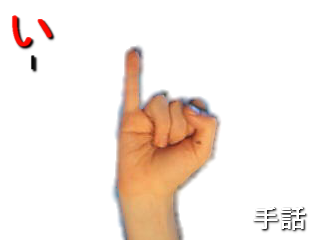
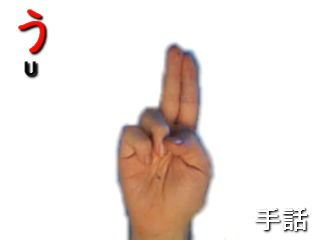
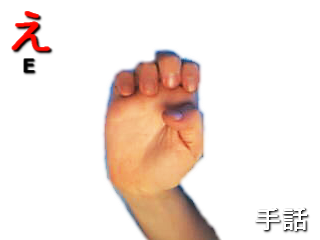
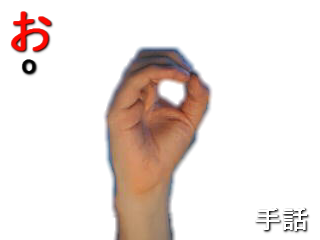
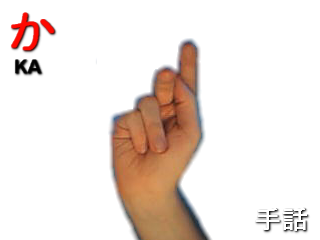
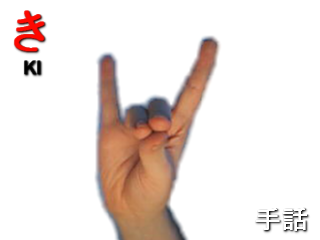
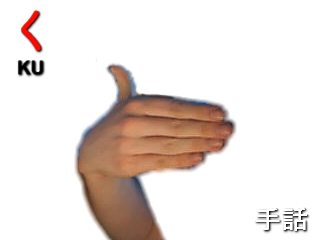
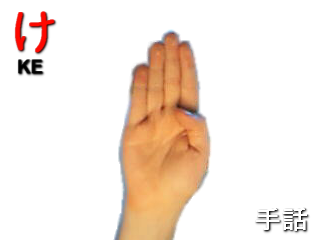
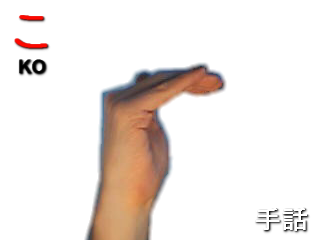
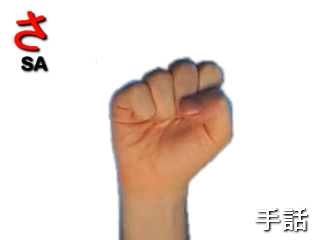
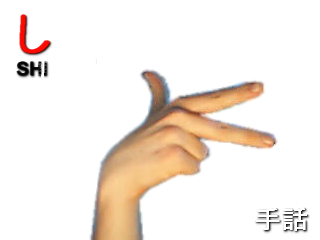
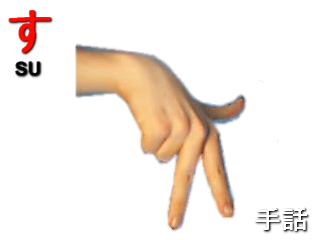
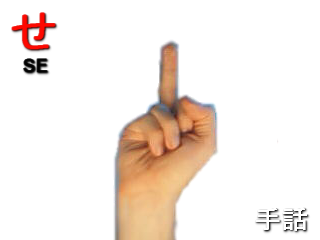
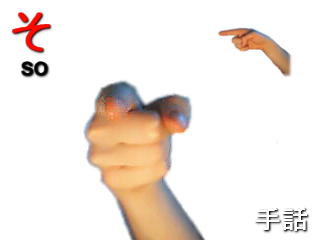
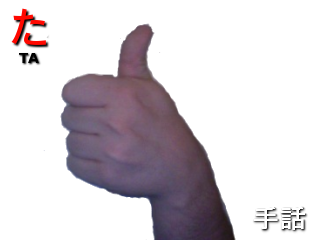
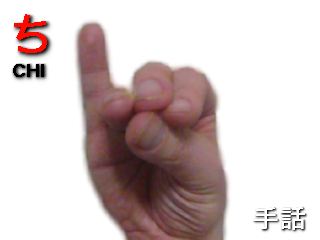
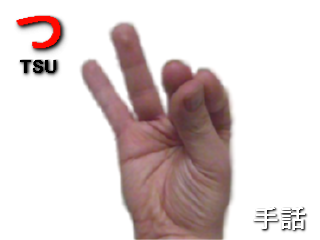
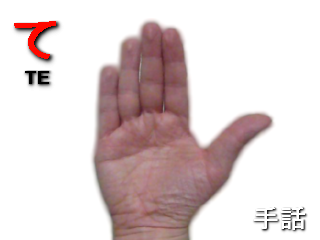
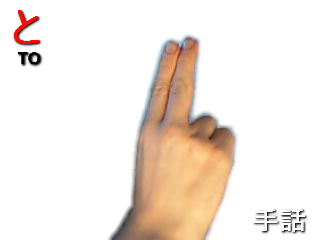
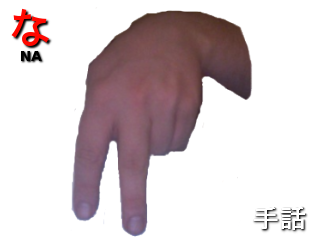
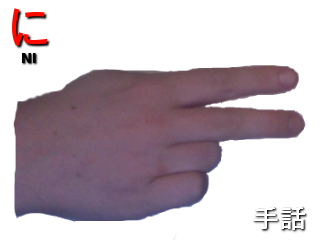
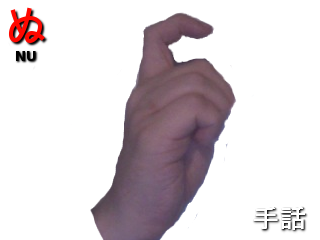
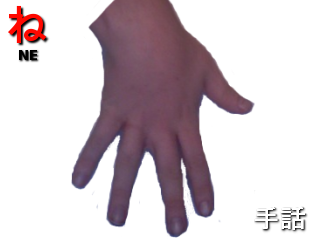
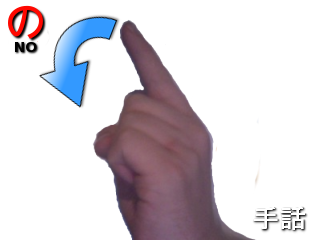
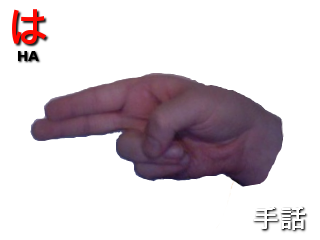
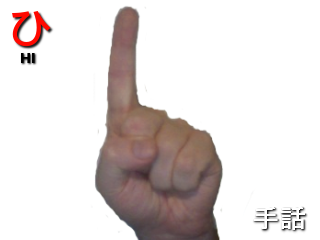
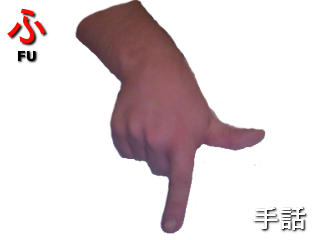
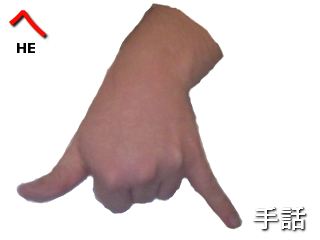
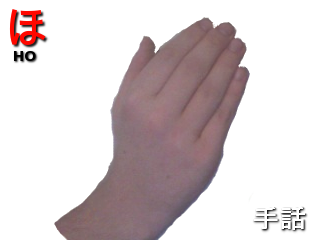
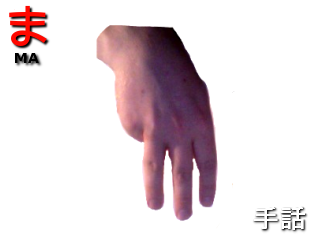
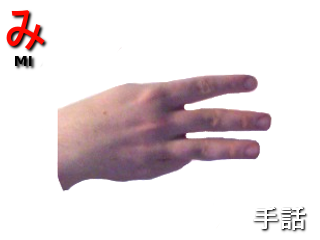
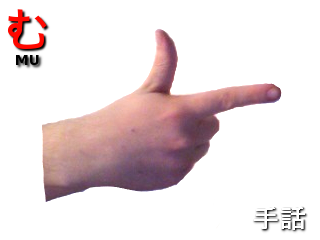
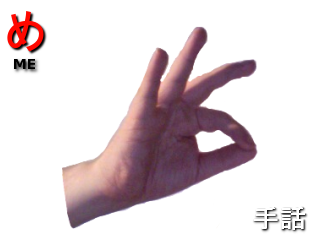
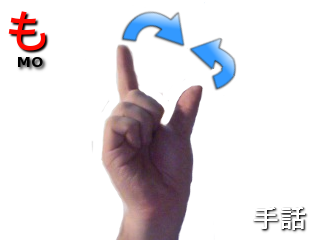
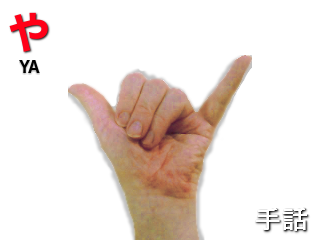
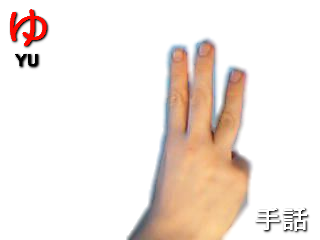
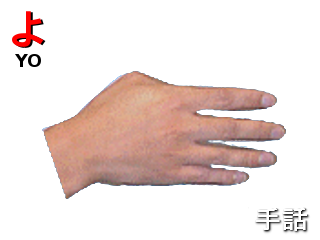
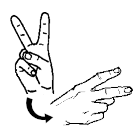
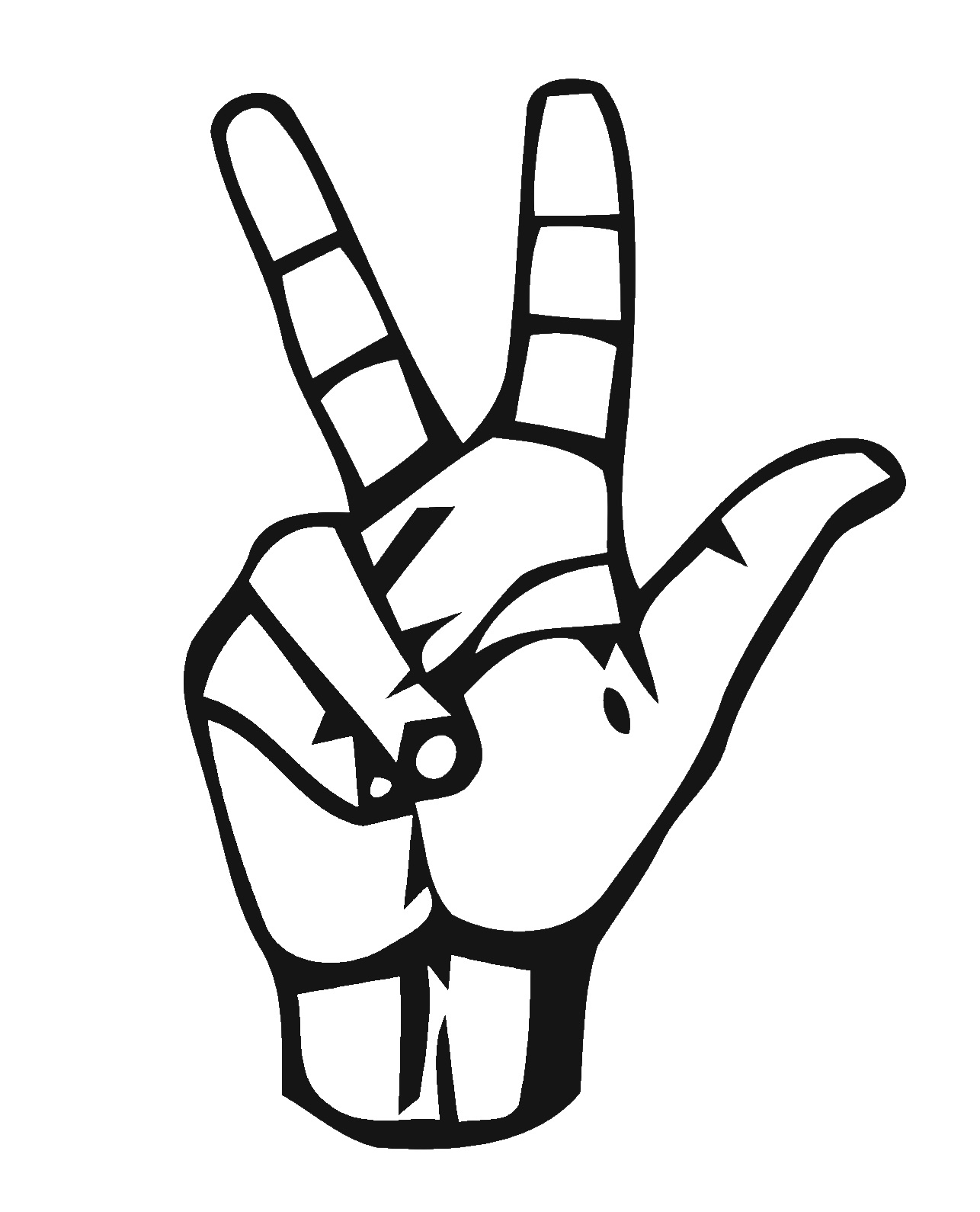
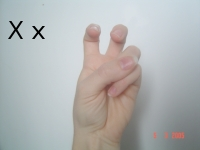
A: a fist with a thumb extended to the side	I: an ASL i hand: a fist with an extended little finger	U: an ASL u or v hand: a fist with an extended index and middle finger	E: a clawed hand, with the fingers and thumb curled in; like ASL e but fingers do not need to touch the thumb	O: an ASL o hand: a rounded hand, as if gripping a pole, thumb touching fingers
KA: an ASL k hand, extended index and middle fingers, with thumb touching first joint of middle finger	KI: 'fox ears', index and little finger raised, thumb touching tips of extended bent-but-flat middle and ring fingers	KU: a JSL 9 hand, all five fingers extended, like ASL 5 but with fingers pointing to the side	KE: an ASL b or 4 hand: the four fingers raised, and thumb pulled in	KO: a bent flat hand, as if hanging from a table top
SA: an ASL s hand: a fist	SHI: a JSL 7 hand: thumb, index, and middle finger, like an ASL 3 hand pointed to the side	SU: a JSL 7 / ASL 3 hand, but fingers pointing downward	SE: a fist with an extended middle finger, palm facing interlocutor	SO: a 'there' hand, extended index finger pointing forward, down, and slightly off to the side
TA: a fist with thumb extended upward	CHI: a JSL 1000 hand: a pursed hand (thumb touching tips of flat fingers) with raised little finger	TSU: a JSL 100 hand: a pursed hand with raised little finger and ring fingers	TE: a fully extended hand, as ASL b with an extended thumb	TO: an ASL u or v, as U, but with palm facing signer
NA: a u or v, but finger pointing downward	NI: a JSL 2 hand: a u or v pointing to the side	NU: an ASL x hand: a fist with a curled index finger	NE: 'roots' hand: an ASL 5 hand pointed downward	NO: traces katakana no, making a curved sweep; like an ASL j hand
HA: the index and middle fingers extended forward, rather like ASL h	HI: a JSL 1 or ASL d hand: the index finger extended upward	FU: an ASL L hand (extended index and thumb) pointed downward	HE: an ASL y hand (extended little finger and thumb) pointed downward	HO: a bent b hand facing the signer, a rotated ko
MA: an ASL w hand (thumb touches little finger) facing the signer, fingers pointing down.	MI: an ASL "w" hand, facing the signer, fingers pointing left (if signing with the Right Hand).	MU Extended index finger and thumb, with index finger pointing to the left (if signing with the Right Hand) and thumb pointing upward.	ME Western "OK" sign, but with index finger and thumb coming to a point, rather than forming a circle.	MO Hand facing upward, with middle, ring and little finger closed into a fist. Spread index finger and thumb outward, and then bring together.
	—		—
YA: an ASL y hand: extended thumb and little finger	—	YU: an ASL w hand (thumb touches little finger) facing the signer	—	YO: a JSL 4 hand, an ASL 4 hand pointing to the side
RA: an ASL r hand: fingers crossed	RI: a sweep like no, but with index and middle fingers extended	RU: an ASL 3 hand: extended thumb, index, & middle finger	RE: an ASL L hand: extended thumb & index finger	RO: like a two-fingered nu or an ASL x hand, with index and middle fingers curled
		WO		N
WA: an ASL w hand: thumb touches little finger, other fingers extended	—	WO: an o hand moved inward	—	N: traces the katakana: index finger sweeps down, then up to the side

== See also ==
- Japanese Sign Language
