= Code page 896 =

IBM AIX character encoding

Code page 896 (CCSIDs 896 and 4992), called Japan 7-Bit Katakana Extended, is IBM's code page for code-set G2 of EUC-JP, a 7-bit code page representing the Kana set (upper half) of JIS X 0201 and accompanying Code page 895 which corresponds to the lower half of that standard. It encodes half-width katakana.

Code page 896 is a 7-bit encoding and therefore does not use the high bit. When it used as the right half of an 8-bit encoding, all values except 0x20 use encoding bytes 0x80 above those defined in the code page (i.e. with the high bit set).

In addition to the standard JIS X 0201 assignments in CCSID 896, CCSID 4992 defines five extended characters at code points 60-64.

== Code page layout ==
Code page 896 / CCSID 4992
	0	1	2	3	4	5	6	7	8	9	A	B	C	D	E	F
0x																
1x																
2x	SP (Note: Listed in Code page 896, available as 0x20 when using ISO 2022 compliant character sets (except 96-character sets). Not used when the codepage is used elsewhere than 0x20–0x7F, e.g. when encoded in 0x8EA0–0x8EFF as part of Code page 954.)	｡	｢	｣	､	･	ｦ	ｧ	ｨ	ｩ	ｪ	ｫ	ｬ	ｭ	ｮ	ｯ
3x	ｰ	ｱ	ｲ	ｳ	ｴ	ｵ	ｶ	ｷ	ｸ	ｹ	ｺ	ｻ	ｼ	ｽ	ｾ	ｿ
4x	ﾀ	ﾁ	ﾂ	ﾃ	ﾄ	ﾅ	ﾆ	ﾇ	ﾈ	ﾉ	ﾊ	ﾋ	ﾌ	ﾍ	ﾎ	ﾏ
5x	ﾐ	ﾑ	ﾒ	ﾓ	ﾔ	ﾕ	ﾖ	ﾗ	ﾘ	ﾙ	ﾚ	ﾛ	ﾜ	ﾝ	ﾞ	ﾟ
6x	¢	£	¬	\	~											
7x																

Excluded by CCSID 896 (differences from JIS X 0201 Kana set / ISO-IR-013)
