= Ya (kana) =

ya

Hiragana	Katakana
- Transliteration: ya
- Hiragana origin: 也
- Katakana origin: 也
- Man'yōgana: 也 移 夜 楊 耶 野 八 矢 屋
- Spelling kana: 大和のヤ Yamato no "ya"
- Unicode: U+3084, U+30E4
- Braille: ⠌

Ya (hiragana: や, katakana: ヤ) is one of the Japanese kana, each of which represents one mora. The hiragana is written in three strokes, while the katakana is written in two. Both represent [ja]. Their shapes have origins in the character 也.

When small and preceded by an -i kana, this kana represents a palatalization of the preceding consonant sound with the [a] vowel (see yōon).

や can be used by itself as a grammatical particle to connect words in a nonexhaustive list (see Japanese particles#ya).

Form	Rōmaji	Hiragana	Katakana
Normal y- (や行 ya-gyō)	ya	や	ヤ
Normal y- (や行 ya-gyō)	yaa yā	やあ, やぁ やー	ヤア, ヤァ ヤー

== Stroke order ==
Stroke order in writing や

Stroke order in writing ヤ

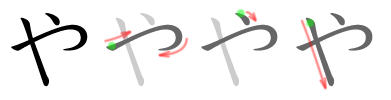
Stroke order in writing や

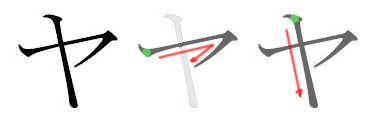
Stroke order in writing ヤ

== Other communicative representations ==
Japanese radiotelephony alphabet	Wabun code
大和のヤ; Yamato no "Ya"	▄ ▄▄▄ ▄▄▄

Japanese Navy Signal Flag

Japanese semaphore
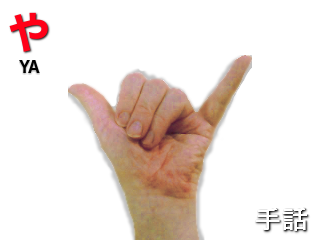
Japanese manual syllabary (fingerspelling)
Braille dots-34
Japanese Braille

=== Braille forms ===
や / ヤ in Japanese Braille
や / ヤ ya	やあ / ヤー yā	ゃ/ャ; Yōon*	゛ゃ/゛ャ; Dakuten + Yōon*	゜ゃ/゜ャ; Handakuten + Yōon*
⠌ (braille pattern dots-34)	⠌ (braille pattern dots-34) ⠒ (braille pattern dots-25)	⠈ (braille pattern dots-4)	⠘ (braille pattern dots-45)	⠨ (braille pattern dots-46)

* The yōon characters ゃ and ャ are encoded in Japanese Braille by prefixing "-a" kana (e.g. Ka, Sa) with a yōon braille indicator, which can be combined with the "Dakuten" or "Handakuten" braille indicators for the appropriate consonant sounds.

=== Computer encodings ===
Character information
Preview	や		ヤ		ﾔ		㋳	
Unicode name	HIRAGANA LETTER YA		KATAKANA LETTER YA		HALFWIDTH KATAKANA LETTER YA		CIRCLED KATAKANA YA	
Encodings	decimal	hex	dec	hex	dec	hex	dec	hex
Unicode	12420	U+3084	12516	U+30E4	65428	U+FF94	13043	U+32F3
UTF-8	227 130 132	E3 82 84	227 131 164	E3 83 A4	239 190 148	EF BE 94	227 139 179	E3 8B B3
Numeric character reference	&#12420;	&#x3084;	&#12516;	&#x30E4;	&#65428;	&#xFF94;	&#13043;	&#x32F3;
Shift JIS	130 226	82 E2	131 132	83 84	212	D4		
EUC-JP	164 228	A4 E4	165 228	A5 E4	142 212	8E D4		
GB 18030	164 228	A4 E4	165 228	A5 E4	132 49 154 56	84 31 9A 38		
EUC-KR / UHC	170 228	AA E4	171 228	AB E4				
Big5 (non-ETEN kana)	198 232	C6 E8	199 124	C7 7C				
Big5 (ETEN / HKSCS)	199 107	C7 6B	199 224	C7 E0				

Character information
Preview	ゃ		ャ		ｬ	
Unicode name	HIRAGANA LETTER SMALL YA		KATAKANA LETTER SMALL YA		HALFWIDTH KATAKANA LETTER SMALL YA	
Encodings	decimal	hex	dec	hex	dec	hex
Unicode	12419	U+3083	12515	U+30E3	65388	U+FF6C
UTF-8	227 130 131	E3 82 83	227 131 163	E3 83 A3	239 189 172	EF BD AC
Numeric character reference	&#12419;	&#x3083;	&#12515;	&#x30E3;	&#65388;	&#xFF6C;
Shift JIS	130 225	82 E1	131 131	83 83	172	AC
EUC-JP	164 227	A4 E3	165 227	A5 E3	142 172	8E AC
GB 18030	164 227	A4 E3	165 227	A5 E3	132 49 150 56	84 31 96 38
EUC-KR / UHC	170 227	AA E3	171 227	AB E3		
Big5 (non-ETEN kana)	198 231	C6 E7	199 123	C7 7B		
Big5 (ETEN/> / HKSCS)	199 106	C7 6A	199 223	C7 DF		
