= Yu (kana) =

yu

Hiragana	Katakana
- Transliteration: yu
- Hiragana origin: 由
- Katakana origin: 由
- Man'yōgana: 由 喩 遊 湯
- Spelling kana: 弓矢のユ; Yumiya no "yu"
- Unicode: U+3086, U+30E6
- Braille: ⠬

Yu (hiragana: ゆ, katakana: ユ) is one of the Japanese kana, which each represents one mora. Both the hiragana and katakana forms are written in two strokes and represent the sound [jɯ]. The hiragana character ゆ is based on the sōsho style of the kanji 由, while the katakana ユ is based on a simplification of the kanji 弓.

When small and preceded by an -i kana, this kana represents a palatalization of the preceding consonant sound with the [ɯ] vowel (see yōon). In loanwords, this kana, along with its small form can be used to approximate vowels such as [y], [ʏ], [juː] and [jʊ].

Forms	Rōmaji	Hiragana	Katakana
Normal y- (や行 ya-gyō)	yu	ゆ	ユ
Normal y- (や行 ya-gyō)	yuu yū	ゆう ゆー	ユウ ユー

== Stroke order ==
Stroke order in writing ゆ

Stroke order in writing ユ

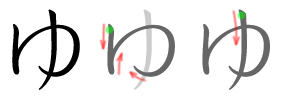
Stroke order in writing ゆ

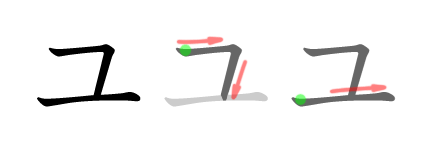
Stroke order in writing ユ

== Other communicative representations ==
Japanese radiotelephony alphabet	Wabun code
弓矢のユ; Yumiya no "Yu"	▄▄▄ ▄ ▄ ▄▄▄ ▄▄▄

Japanese Navy Signal Flag

Japanese semaphore
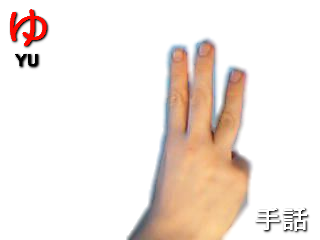
Japanese manual syllabary (fingerspelling)
Braille dots-346
Japanese Braille

=== Braille forms ===
ゆ / ユ in Japanese Braille
ゆ / ユ yu	ゆう / ユー yū	ゅ/ュ; Yōon*	゛ゅ/゛ュ; Dakuten + Yōon*	゜ゅ/゜ュ; Handakuten + Yōon*
⠬ (braille pattern dots-346)	⠬ (braille pattern dots-346) ⠒ (braille pattern dots-25)	⠈ (braille pattern dots-4)	⠘ (braille pattern dots-45)	⠨ (braille pattern dots-46)

* The yōon characters ゅ and ュ are encoded in Japanese Braille by prefixing "-u" kana (e.g. Ku, Su) with a yōon braille indicator, which can be combined with the "Dakuten" or "Handakuten" braille indicators for the appropriate consonant sounds.

=== Computer encodings ===
Character information
Preview	ゆ		ユ		ﾕ		㋴	
Unicode name	HIRAGANA LETTER YU		KATAKANA LETTER YU		HALFWIDTH KATAKANA LETTER YU		CIRCLED KATAKANA YU	
Encodings	decimal	hex	dec	hex	dec	hex	dec	hex
Unicode	12422	U+3086	12518	U+30E6	65429	U+FF95	13044	U+32F4
UTF-8	227 130 134	E3 82 86	227 131 166	E3 83 A6	239 190 149	EF BE 95	227 139 180	E3 8B B4
Numeric character reference	&#12422;	&#x3086;	&#12518;	&#x30E6;	&#65429;	&#xFF95;	&#13044;	&#x32F4;
Shift JIS	130 228	82 E4	131 134	83 86	213	D5		
EUC-JP	164 230	A4 E6	165 230	A5 E6	142 213	8E D5		
GB 18030	164 230	A4 E6	165 230	A5 E6	132 49 154 57	84 31 9A 39		
EUC-KR / UHC	170 230	AA E6	171 230	AB E6				
Big5 (non-ETEN kana)	198 234	C6 EA	199 126	C7 7E				
Big5 (ETEN / HKSCS)	199 109	C7 6D	199 226	C7 E2				

Character information
Preview	ゅ		ュ		ｭ	
Unicode name	HIRAGANA LETTER SMALL YU		KATAKANA LETTER SMALL YU		HALFWIDTH KATAKANA LETTER SMALL YU	
Encodings	decimal	hex	dec	hex	dec	hex
Unicode	12421	U+3085	12517	U+30E5	65389	U+FF6D
UTF-8	227 130 133	E3 82 85	227 131 165	E3 83 A5	239 189 173	EF BD AD
Numeric character reference	&#12421;	&#x3085;	&#12517;	&#x30E5;	&#65389;	&#xFF6D;
Shift JIS	130 227	82 E3	131 133	83 85	173	AD
EUC-JP	164 229	A4 E5	165 229	A5 E5	142 173	8E AD
GB 18030	164 229	A4 E5	165 229	A5 E5	132 49 150 57	84 31 96 39
EUC-KR / UHC	170 229	AA E5	171 229	AB E5		
Big5 (non-ETEN kana)	198 233	C6 E9	199 125	C7 7D		
Big5 (ETEN/> / HKSCS)	199 108	C7 6C	199 225	C7 E1		
