= Japanese radiotelephony alphabet =

Spelling alphabet for kana

The Japanese radiotelephony alphabet (和文通話表, wabuntsūwahyō; literally "Japanese character telecommunication chart") is a radiotelephony spelling alphabet, similar in purpose to the NATO/ICAO radiotelephony alphabet, but designed to communicate the Japanese kana syllables rather than Latin letters. The alphabet was sponsored by the now-defunct Ministry for Posts and Telecommunications.

Each kana is assigned a code word, so that critical combinations of kana (and numbers) can be pronounced and clearly understood by those who transmit and receive voice messages by radio or telephone, especially when the safety of navigation or persons is essential.

There are specific names for kana, numerals, and special characters (i.e. vowel extender, comma, quotation mark, and parentheses).

== Kana ==
Every kana name takes the form of a X no Y (X の Y). For example, ringo no ri (りんごのリ) means "ri of ringo". Voiced kana do not have special names of their own. Instead, one simply states the unvoiced form, followed by "ni dakuten". /p/ sounds are named similarly, with "ni handakuten". Thus, to convey ba (ば), one would say "hagaki no ha ni dakuten (はがきのハに濁点)". To convey pa (ぱ), one would say "hagaki no ha ni handakuten (はがきのハに半濁点)". As no word begins with the syllabic n, the word oshimai (おしまい), meaning end, is used for n (ん).

Kana	Spelling	Kana	Spelling	Kana	Spelling	Kana	Spelling	Kana	Spelling
あ/ア	朝日のア; Asahi no "a"	い/イ	いろはのイ; Iroha no "i"	う/ウ	上野のウ; Ueno no "u"	え/エ	英語のエ; Eigo no "e"	お/オ	大阪のオ; Ōsaka no "o"
か/カ	為替のカ; Kawase no "ka"	き/キ	切手のキ; Kitte no "ki"	く/ク	クラブのク; Kurabu no "ku"	け/ケ	景色のケ; Keshiki no "ke"	こ/コ	子供のコ; Kodomo no "ko"
さ/サ	桜のサ; Sakura no "sa"	し/シ	新聞のシ; Shinbun no "shi"	す/ス	すずめのス; Suzume no "su"	せ/セ	世界のセ; Sekai no "se"	そ/ソ	そろばんのソ; Soroban no "so"
た/タ	煙草のタ; Tabako no "ta"	ち/チ	千鳥のチ; Chidori no "chi"	つ/ツ	つるかめのツ; Tsurukame no "tsu"	て/テ	手紙のテ; Tegami no "te"	と/ト	東京のト; Tōkyō no "to"
な/ナ	名古屋のナ; Nagoya no "na"	に/ニ	日本のニ; Nippon no "ni" (Note: The spelling of ni should be pronounced にっぽん (nippon), pronouncing it as にほん (nihon) is considered incorrect.)	ぬ/ヌ	沼津のヌ; Numazu no "nu"	ね/ネ	ねずみのネ; Nezumi no "ne"	の/ノ	野原のノ; Nohara no "no"
は/ハ	はがきのハ; Hagaki no "ha"	ひ/ヒ	飛行機のヒ; Hikōki no "hi"	ふ/フ	富士山のフ; Fujisan no "fu"	へ/ヘ	平和のヘ; Heiwa no "he"	ほ/ホ	保険のホ; Hoken no "ho"
ま/マ	マッチのマ; Matchi no "ma"	み/ミ	三笠のミ; Mikasa no "mi"	む/ム	無線のム; Musen no "mu"	め/メ	明治のメ; Meiji no "me"	も/モ	もみじのモ; Momiji no "mo"
や/ヤ	大和のヤ; Yamato no "ya"			ゆ/ユ	弓矢のユ; Yumiya no "yu"			よ/ヨ	吉野のヨ; Yoshino no "yo"
ら/ラ	ラジオのラ; Rajio no "ra"	り/リ	りんごのリ; Ringo no "ri"	る/ル	留守居のル; Rusui no "ru"	れ/レ	れんげのレ; Renge no "re"	ろ/ロ	ローマのロ; Rōma no "ro"
わ/ワ	わらびのワ; Warabi no "wa"	ゐ/ヰ	ゐどのヰ (W)ido no "(w)i"			ゑ/ヱ	かぎのあるヱ; Kagi no aru "e"	を/ヲ	尾張のヲ (W)owari no "(w)o"
ん/ン	おしまいのン; Oshimai no "n"	゛	濁点; Dakuten	゜	半濁点; Handakuten				

== Numerals ==
Digits are identified with "数字の..." (sūji no.../Number X) followed by the name of the number, analogous to English phrases such as the number five.

When a number can be named in multiple ways, the most distinctive pronunciation is used. Thus 1, 7, 4 are pronounced hito, nana, yon rather than ichi, shichi, shi which could easily be confused with each other.

Digit	Spelling	Pronunciation
0	数字のまる	Sūji no maru
1	数字のひと	Sūji no hito
2	数字のに	Sūji no ni
3	数字のさん	Sūji no san
4	数字のよん	Sūji no yon
5	数字のご	Sūji no go
6	数字のろく	Sūji no roku
7	数字のなな	Sūji no nana
8	数字のはち	Sūji no hachi
9	数字のきゅう	Sūji no kyū

== Special symbols ==
Symbol	Spelling	Pronunciation
ー	長音	Chōon
、	区切り点	Kugiri ten
∟	段落	Danraku
（	下向括弧	Shitamuki kakko
）	上向括弧	Uwamuki kakko

== Sources ==
- "別表第五号 通話表(第14条関係)" (PDF) (in Japanese). Ministry of Internal Affairs and Communications. Archived from the original (PDF) on 2019-06-02.
