= Me (kana) =

me

| Hiragana | Katakana |
- Transliteration: me
- Hiragana origin: 女
- Katakana origin: 女
- Man'yōgana: 売 馬 面 女 梅 米 迷 昧 目 眼 海
- Spelling kana: 明治のメ Meiji no "me"
- Unicode: U+3081, U+30E1
- Braille: ⠿
- Note: These Man'yōgana originally represented morae with one of two different vowel sounds, which merged in later pronunciation

Me (hiragana: め, katakana: メ) is one of the Japanese kana, each of which represents one mora. Both versions of the kana are written in two strokes and represent [me].

| Form | Rōmaji | Hiragana | Katakana |
|---|---|---|---|
| Normal m- (ま行 ma-gyō) | me | め | メ |
| Normal m- (ま行 ma-gyō) | mei mee mē | めい, めぃ めえ, めぇ めー | メイ, メィ メエ, メェ メー |

== Stroke order ==
Stroke order in writing め

Stroke order in writing メ

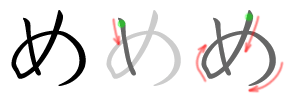
Stroke order in writing め

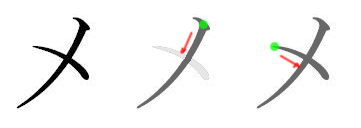
Stroke order in writing メ

== Other communicative representations ==
| Japanese radiotelephony alphabet | Wabun code |
| 明治のメ; Meiji no "Me" | ▄▄▄ ▄ ▄ ▄ ▄▄▄ |

Japanese Navy Signal Flag

Japanese semaphore
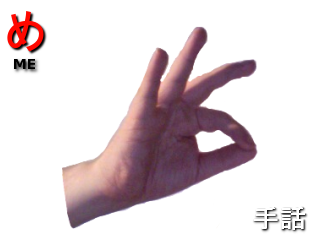
Japanese manual syllabary (fingerspelling)
Braille dots-123456
Japanese Braille

=== Braille forms ===
め / メ in Japanese Braille
| め / メ me | めい / メー mē/mei |
| ⠿ (braille pattern dots-123456) | ⠿ (braille pattern dots-123456) ⠒ (braille pattern dots-25) |

=== Computer encodings ===
Character information
| Preview | め | | メ | | ﾒ | | ㋱ | |
|---|---|---|---|---|---|---|---|---|
| Unicode name | HIRAGANA LETTER ME | | KATAKANA LETTER ME | | HALFWIDTH KATAKANA LETTER ME | | CIRCLED KATAKANA ME | |
| Encodings | decimal | hex | dec | hex | dec | hex | dec | hex |
| Unicode | 12417 | U+3081 | 12513 | U+30E1 | 65426 | U+FF92 | 13041 | U+32F1 |
| UTF-8 | 227 130 129 | E3 82 81 | 227 131 161 | E3 83 A1 | 239 190 146 | EF BE 92 | 227 139 177 | E3 8B B1 |
| Numeric character reference | &#12417; | &#x3081; | &#12513; | &#x30E1; | &#65426; | &#xFF92; | &#13041; | &#x32F1; |
| Shift JIS | 130 223 | 82 DF | 131 129 | 83 81 | 210 | D2 | | |
| EUC-JP | 164 225 | A4 E1 | 165 225 | A5 E1 | 142 210 | 8E D2 | | |
| GB 18030 | 164 225 | A4 E1 | 165 225 | A5 E1 | 132 49 154 54 | 84 31 9A 36 | | |
| EUC-KR / UHC | 170 225 | AA E1 | 171 225 | AB E1 | | | | |
| Big5 (non-ETEN kana) | 198 229 | C6 E5 | 199 121 | C7 79 | | | | |
| Big5 (ETEN / HKSCS) | 199 104 | C7 68 | 199 221 | C7 DD | | | | |
