= Mo (kana) =

mo

Hiragana	Katakana
- Transliteration: mo
- Hiragana origin: 毛
- Katakana origin: 毛
- Man'yōgana: 毛 畝 蒙 木 問 聞 方 面 忘 母 文 茂 記 勿 物 望 門 喪 裳 藻
- Spelling kana: もみじのモ Momiji no "mo"
- Unicode: U+3082, U+30E2
- Braille: ⠾
- Note: These Man'yōgana originally represented morae with one of two different vowel sounds, which merged in later pronunciation

Mo (hiragana: も, katakana: モ) is one of the Japanese kana, each of which represents one mora. Both are made in three strokes and both represent [mo].

モー is sometimes used as the onomatopoeia for cows.

Form	Rōmaji	Hiragana	Katakana
Normal m- (ま行 ma-gyō)	mo	も	モ
Normal m- (ま行 ma-gyō)	mou moo mō	もう, もぅ もお, もぉ もー	モウ, モゥ モオ, モォ モー

== Stroke order ==
Stroke order in writing も

Stroke order in writing モ

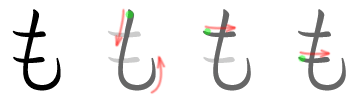
Stroke order in writing も

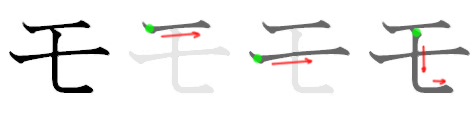
Stroke order in writing モ

== Other communicative representations ==
Japanese radiotelephony alphabet	Wabun code
もみじのモ; Momiji no "Mo"	▄▄▄ ▄ ▄ ▄▄▄ ▄

Japanese Navy Signal Flag

Japanese semaphore
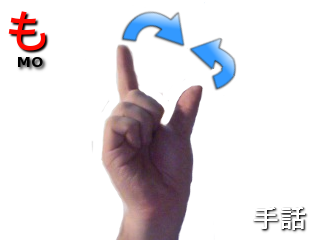
Japanese manual syllabary (fingerspelling)
Braille dots-23456
Japanese Braille

=== Braille forms ===
も / モ in Japanese Braille
も / モ mo	もう / モー mō	Other kana based on Braille も	
も / モ mo	もう / モー mō	みょ / ミョ myo	みょう / ミョー myō
⠾ (braille pattern dots-23456)	⠾ (braille pattern dots-23456) ⠒ (braille pattern dots-25)	⠈ (braille pattern dots-4) ⠾ (braille pattern dots-23456)	⠈ (braille pattern dots-4) ⠾ (braille pattern dots-23456) ⠒ (braille pattern dots-25)

=== Computer encodings ===
Character information
Preview	も		モ		ﾓ		㋲	
Unicode name	HIRAGANA LETTER MO		KATAKANA LETTER MO		HALFWIDTH KATAKANA LETTER MO		CIRCLED KATAKANA MO	
Encodings	decimal	hex	dec	hex	dec	hex	dec	hex
Unicode	12418	U+3082	12514	U+30E2	65427	U+FF93	13042	U+32F2
UTF-8	227 130 130	E3 82 82	227 131 162	E3 83 A2	239 190 147	EF BE 93	227 139 178	E3 8B B2
Numeric character reference	&#12418;	&#x3082;	&#12514;	&#x30E2;	&#65427;	&#xFF93;	&#13042;	&#x32F2;
Shift JIS	130 224	82 E0	131 130	83 82	211	D3		
EUC-JP	164 226	A4 E2	165 226	A5 E2	142 211	8E D3		
GB 18030	164 226	A4 E2	165 226	A5 E2	132 49 154 55	84 31 9A 37		
EUC-KR / UHC	170 226	AA E2	171 226	AB E2				
Big5 (non-ETEN kana)	198 230	C6 E6	199 122	C7 7A				
Big5 (ETEN / HKSCS)	199 105	C7 69	199 222	C7 DE				
