= Se (kana) =

Character in the Japanese writing system

se

| Hiragana | Katakana |
- Transliteration: se
- Translit. with dakuten: ze
- Hiragana origin: 世
- Katakana origin: 世
- Man'yōgana: 世 西 斉 勢 施 背 脊 迫 瀬
- Voiced man'yōgana: 是 湍
- Spelling kana: 世界のセ (Sekai no "se")

Se (hiragana: せ, katakana: セ) is one of the Japanese kana, each of which represents one mora. Both represent the sound [se], and when written with dakuten represent the sound [ze]. In the Ainu language, the katakana セ is sometimes written with a handakuten (which can be entered into a computer as either one character (セ゚) or two combined ones (セ゜) to represent the [t͡se] sound, and is interchangeable with ツェ (tse).

| Form | Rōmaji | Hiragana | Katakana |
|---|---|---|---|
| Normal s- (さ行 sa-gyō) | se | せ | セ |
| Normal s- (さ行 sa-gyō) | sei see sē | せい, せぃ せえ, せぇ せー | セイ, セィ セエ, セェ セー |
| Addition dakuten z- (ざ行 za-gyō) | ze | ぜ | ゼ |
| Addition dakuten z- (ざ行 za-gyō) | zei zee zē | ぜい, ぜぃ ぜえ, ぜぇ ぜー | ゼイ, ゼィ ゼエ, ゼェ ゼー |

== Stroke order ==
Stroke order in writing せ

3

Stroke order in writing セ

2

Stroke order in writing せ

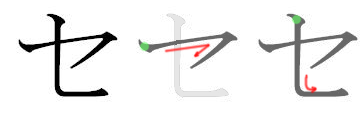
Stroke order in writing セ

== Other communicative representations ==
| Japanese radiotelephony alphabet | Wabun code |
| 世界のセ; Sekai no "Se" | ▄ ▄▄▄ ▄▄▄ ▄▄▄ ▄ |

Japanese Navy Signal Flag

Japanese semaphore
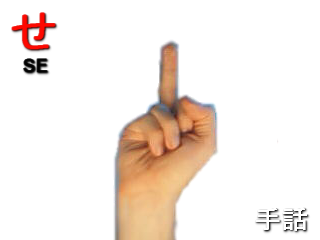
Japanese manual syllabary (fingerspelling)
Braille dots-12456
Japanese Braille

=== Braille forms ===
せ / セ in Japanese Braille
| せ / セ se | ぜ / ゼ ze | せい / セー sē/sei | ぜい / ゼー zē/zei |
| ⠻ (braille pattern dots-12456) | ⠐ (braille pattern dots-5) ⠻ (braille pattern dots-12456) | ⠻ (braille pattern dots-12456) ⠒ (braille pattern dots-25) | ⠐ (braille pattern dots-5) ⠻ (braille pattern dots-12456) ⠒ (braille pattern dots-25) |

=== Computer encodings ===
Character information
| Preview | せ | | セ | | ｾ | | ㋝ | |
|---|---|---|---|---|---|---|---|---|
| Unicode name | HIRAGANA LETTER SE | | KATAKANA LETTER SE | | HALFWIDTH KATAKANA LETTER SE | | CIRCLED KATAKANA SE | |
| Encodings | decimal | hex | dec | hex | dec | hex | dec | hex |
| Unicode | 12379 | U+305B | 12475 | U+30BB | 65406 | U+FF7E | 13021 | U+32DD |
| UTF-8 | 227 129 155 | E3 81 9B | 227 130 187 | E3 82 BB | 239 189 190 | EF BD BE | 227 139 157 | E3 8B 9D |
| Numeric character reference | &#12379; | &#x305B; | &#12475; | &#x30BB; | &#65406; | &#xFF7E; | &#13021; | &#x32DD; |
| Shift JIS | 130 185 | 82 B9 | 131 90 | 83 5A | 190 | BE | | |
| EUC-JP | 164 187 | A4 BB | 165 187 | A5 BB | 142 190 | 8E BE | | |
| GB 18030 | 164 187 | A4 BB | 165 187 | A5 BB | 132 49 152 54 | 84 31 98 36 | | |
| EUC-KR / UHC | 170 187 | AA BB | 171 187 | AB BB | | | | |
| Big5 (non-ETEN kana) | 198 191 | C6 BF | 199 83 | C7 53 | | | | |
| Big5 (ETEN / HKSCS) | 199 66 | C7 42 | 199 183 | C7 B7 | | | | |

Character information
| Preview | 𛄶 | | 𛅗 | | ぜ | | ゼ | | セ゚ | |
|---|---|---|---|---|---|---|---|---|---|---|
| Unicode name | HIRAGANA LETTER SMALL SE | | KATAKANA LETTER SMALL SE | | HIRAGANA LETTER ZE | | KATAKANA LETTER ZE | | KATAKANA LETTER AINU CE | |
| Encodings | decimal | hex | dec | hex | dec | hex | dec | hex | dec | hex |
| Unicode | 110902 | U+1B136 | 110935 | U+1B157 | 12380 | U+305C | 12476 | U+30BC | 12475 12442 | U+30BB+309A |
| UTF-8 | 240 155 132 182 | F0 9B 84 B6 | 240 155 133 151 | F0 9B 85 97 | 227 129 156 | E3 81 9C | 227 130 188 | E3 82 BC | 227 130 187 227 130 154 | E3 82 BB E3 82 9A |
| UTF-16 | 55340 56630 | D82C DD36 | 55340 56663 | D82C DD57 | 12380 | 305C | 12476 | 30BC | 12475 12442 | 30BB 309A |
| Numeric character reference | &#110902; | &#x1B136; | &#110935; | &#x1B157; | &#12380; | &#x305C; | &#12476; | &#x30BC; | &#12475;&#12442; | &#x30BB;&#x309A; |
| Shift JIS (plain) | 130 186 | 82 BA | 131 91 | 83 5B | | | | | | |
| Shift JIS-2004 | 130 186 | 82 BA | 131 91 | 83 5B | 131 156 | 83 9C | | | | |
| EUC-JP (plain) | 164 188 | A4 BC | 165 188 | A5 BC | | | | | | |
| EUC-JIS-2004 | 164 188 | A4 BC | 165 188 | A5 BC | 165 252 | A5 FC | | | | |
| GB 18030 | 164 188 | A4 BC | 165 188 | A5 BC | | | | | | |
| EUC-KR / UHC | 170 188 | AA BC | 171 188 | AB BC | | | | | | |
| Big5 (non-ETEN kana) | 198 192 | C6 C0 | 199 84 | C7 54 | | | | | | |
| Big5 (ETEN / HKSCS) | 199 67 | C7 43 | 199 184 | C7 B8 | | | | | | |
