= Ra (kana) =

ra

Hiragana	Katakana
- Transliteration: ra
- Hiragana origin: 良
- Katakana origin: 良
- Man'yōgana: 良 浪 郎 楽 羅 等
- Spelling kana: ラジオのラ Rajio no "ra"
- Unicode: U+3089, U+30E9
- Braille: ⠑

Ra (hiragana: ら; katakana: ラ) is one of the Japanese kana, which each represent one mora. Both versions are written with two strokes and have origins in the character 良; both characters represent the sound [ɾa]. The Ainu language uses a small katakana ㇻ to represent a final r sound after an a sound (アㇻ ar).

Form	Rōmaji	Hiragana	Katakana
Normal r- (ら行 ra-gyō)	ra	ら	ラ
Normal r- (ら行 ra-gyō)	raa rā	らあ らー	ラア ラー

== Stroke order ==
Stroke order in writing ら

Stroke order in writing ラ

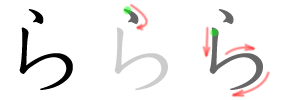
Stroke order in writing ら

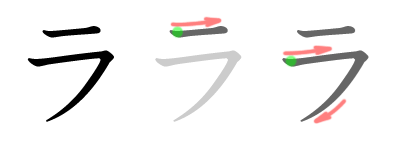
Stroke order in writing ラ

== Other communicative representations ==
Japanese radiotelephony alphabet	Wabun code
ラジオのラ; Rajio no "Ra"	▄ ▄ ▄

Japanese Navy Signal Flag

Japanese semaphore

Japanese manual syllabary (fingerspelling)
Braille dots-15
Japanese Braille

=== Braille forms ===
ら / ラ in Japanese Braille
ら / ラ ra	らあ / ラー rā	Other kana based on Braille ら	
ら / ラ ra	らあ / ラー rā	りゃ / リャ rya	りゃあ / リャー ryā
⠑ (braille pattern dots-15)	⠑ (braille pattern dots-15) ⠒ (braille pattern dots-25)	⠈ (braille pattern dots-4) ⠑ (braille pattern dots-15)	⠈ (braille pattern dots-4) ⠑ (braille pattern dots-15) ⠒ (braille pattern dots-25)

=== Computer encodings ===
Character information
Preview	ら		ラ		ﾗ		ㇻ		㋶	
Unicode name	HIRAGANA LETTER RA		KATAKANA LETTER RA		HALFWIDTH KATAKANA LETTER RA		KATAKANA LETTER SMALL RA		CIRCLED KATAKANA RA	
Encodings	decimal	hex	dec	hex	dec	hex	dec	hex	dec	hex
Unicode	12425	U+3089	12521	U+30E9	65431	U+FF97	12795	U+31FB	13046	U+32F6
UTF-8	227 130 137	E3 82 89	227 131 169	E3 83 A9	239 190 151	EF BE 97	227 135 187	E3 87 BB	227 139 182	E3 8B B6
Numeric character reference	&#12425;	&#x3089;	&#12521;	&#x30E9;	&#65431;	&#xFF97;	&#12795;	&#x31FB;	&#13046;	&#x32F6;
Shift JIS (plain)	130 231	82 E7	131 137	83 89	215	D7				
Shift JIS-2004	130 231	82 E7	131 137	83 89	215	D7	131 248	83 F8		
EUC-JP (plain)	164 233	A4 E9	165 233	A5 E9	142 215	8E D7				
EUC-JIS-2004	164 233	A4 E9	165 233	A5 E9	142 215	8E D7	166 250	A6 FA		
GB 18030	164 233	A4 E9	165 233	A5 E9	132 49 155 49	84 31 9B 31	129 57 189 53	81 39 BD 35		
EUC-KR / UHC	170 233	AA E9	171 233	AB E9						
Big5 (non-ETEN kana)	198 237	C6 ED	199 163	C7 A3						
Big5 (ETEN / HKSCS)	199 112	C7 70	199 229	C7 E5						

== See also ==
- Japanese phonology
