= Ru (kana) =

ru

Hiragana	Katakana
- Transliteration: ru
- Hiragana origin: 留
- Katakana origin: 流
- Man'yōgana: 留 流 類
- Spelling kana: 留守居のル Rusui no "ru"
- Unicode: U+308B, U+30EB
- Braille: ⠙

Ru (hiragana: る, katakana: ル) is one of the Japanese kana, each of which represent one mora. The hiragana is written in one stroke; the katakana in two. Both represent the sound [ɾɯ]. The Ainu language uses a small katakana ㇽ to represent a final r sound after an u sound (ウㇽ ur).

Form	Rōmaji	Hiragana	Katakana
Normal r- (ら行 ra-gyō)	ru	る	ル
Normal r- (ら行 ra-gyō)	ruu, rwu rū	るう, るぅ るー	ルウ, ルゥ ルー

Other additional forms

Form (rw-)
Romaji	Hiragana	Katakana
rwa	るぁ, るゎ	ルァ, ルヮ
rwi	るぃ	ルィ
(rwu)	(るぅ)	(ルゥ)
rwe	るぇ	ルェ
rwo	るぉ	ルォ

== Stroke order ==
Stroke order in writing る

Stroke order in writing ル

The hiragana for ru (る) is made with one stroke, and its katakana form (ル) is made with two.

る (hiragana) begins with a horizontal stroke to the right, followed by a slightly longer, angular stroke going down and to the left. Finally, a curve and loop are added to the bottom that somewhat resembles the hiragana no (の). The character as a whole is visually similar to the hiragana for ro (ろ).

ル (katakana) is made by first making a curved stroke going down and to the left, and is followed by a stroke that first goes straight down, and then a curved line going up and to the right.

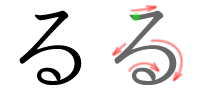
Stroke order in writing る

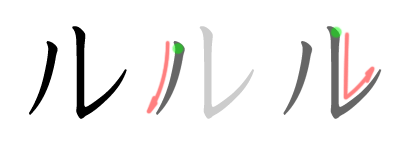
Stroke order in writing ル

== Other communicative representations ==
Japanese radiotelephony alphabet	Wabun code
留守居のル; Rusui no "Ru"	▄▄▄ ▄ ▄▄▄ ▄▄▄ ▄

Japanese Navy Signal Flag

Japanese semaphore

Japanese manual syllabary (fingerspelling)
Braille dots-145
Japanese Braille

=== Braille forms ===
る / ル in Japanese Braille
る / ル ru	るう / ルー rū	Other kana based on Braille る	
る / ル ru	るう / ルー rū	りゅ / リュ ryu	りゅう / リュー ryū
⠙ (braille pattern dots-145)	⠙ (braille pattern dots-145) ⠒ (braille pattern dots-25)	⠈ (braille pattern dots-4) ⠙ (braille pattern dots-145)	⠈ (braille pattern dots-4) ⠙ (braille pattern dots-145) ⠒ (braille pattern dots-25)

=== Computer encodings ===
Character information
Preview	る		ル		ﾙ		ㇽ		㋸	
Unicode name	HIRAGANA LETTER RU		KATAKANA LETTER RU		HALFWIDTH KATAKANA LETTER RU		KATAKANA LETTER SMALL RU		CIRCLED KATAKANA RU	
Encodings	decimal	hex	dec	hex	dec	hex	dec	hex	dec	hex
Unicode	12427	U+308B	12523	U+30EB	65433	U+FF99	12797	U+31FD	13048	U+32F8
UTF-8	227 130 139	E3 82 8B	227 131 171	E3 83 AB	239 190 153	EF BE 99	227 135 189	E3 87 BD	227 139 184	E3 8B B8
Numeric character reference	&#12427;	&#x308B;	&#12523;	&#x30EB;	&#65433;	&#xFF99;	&#12797;	&#x31FD;	&#13048;	&#x32F8;
Shift JIS (plain)	130 233	82 E9	131 139	83 8B	217	D9				
Shift JIS-2004	130 233	82 E9	131 139	83 8B	217	D9	131 250	83 FA		
EUC-JP (plain)	164 235	A4 EB	165 235	A5 EB	142 217	8E D9				
EUC-JIS-2004	164 235	A4 EB	165 235	A5 EB	142 217	8E D9	166 252	A6 FC		
GB 18030	164 235	A4 EB	165 235	A5 EB	132 49 155 51	84 31 9B 33	129 57 189 55	81 39 BD 37		
EUC-KR / UHC	170 235	AA EB	171 235	AB EB						
Big5 (non-ETEN kana)	198 239	C6 EF	199 165	C7 A5						
Big5 (ETEN / HKSCS)	199 114	C7 72	199 231	C7 E7						

== See also ==
- Japanese phonology
