= Re (kana) =

re

Hiragana	Katakana
- Transliteration: re
- Hiragana origin: 礼
- Katakana origin: 礼
- Man'yōgana: 礼 列 例 烈 連
- Spelling kana: れんげのレ Renge no "re"
- Unicode: U+308C, U+30EC
- Braille: ⠛

Re (hiragana: れ, katakana: レ) is one of the Japanese kana, each of which represents one mora. The hiragana is written in two strokes, while katakana in one. Both represent the sound [ɾe]. The shapes of these kana have origins in the character 礼. The Ainu language uses a small katakana ㇾ to represent a final r sound after an e sound (エㇾ er).

Form	Rōmaji	Hiragana	Katakana
Normal r- (ら行 ra-gyō)	re	れ	レ
Normal r- (ら行 ra-gyō)	rei ree rē	れい, れぃ れえ, れぇ れー	レイ, レィ レエ, レェ レー

== Stroke order ==
Stroke order in writing れ

Stroke order in writing レ

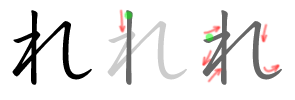
Stroke order in writing れ

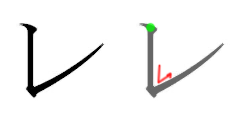
Stroke order in writing レ

== Other communicative representations ==
Japanese radiotelephony alphabet	Wabun code
れんげのレ; Renge no "Re"	▄▄▄ ▄▄▄ ▄▄▄

Japanese Navy Signal Flag

Japanese semaphore

Japanese manual syllabary (fingerspelling)
Braille dots-1245
Japanese Braille

=== Braille forms ===
れ / レ in Japanese Braille
れ / レ re	れい / レー rē/rei
⠛ (braille pattern dots-1245)	⠛ (braille pattern dots-1245) ⠒ (braille pattern dots-25)

=== Computer encodings ===
Character information
Preview	れ		レ		ﾚ		ㇾ		㋹	
Unicode name	HIRAGANA LETTER RE		KATAKANA LETTER RE		HALFWIDTH KATAKANA LETTER RE		KATAKANA LETTER SMALL RE		CIRCLED KATAKANA RE	
Encodings	decimal	hex	dec	hex	dec	hex	dec	hex	dec	hex
Unicode	12428	U+308C	12524	U+30EC	65434	U+FF9A	12798	U+31FE	13049	U+32F9
UTF-8	227 130 140	E3 82 8C	227 131 172	E3 83 AC	239 190 154	EF BE 9A	227 135 190	E3 87 BE	227 139 185	E3 8B B9
Numeric character reference	&#12428;	&#x308C;	&#12524;	&#x30EC;	&#65434;	&#xFF9A;	&#12798;	&#x31FE;	&#13049;	&#x32F9;
Shift JIS (plain)	130 234	82 EA	131 140	83 8C	218	DA				
Shift JIS-2004	130 234	82 EA	131 140	83 8C	218	DA	131 251	83 FB		
EUC-JP (plain)	164 236	A4 EC	165 236	A5 EC	142 218	8E DA				
EUC-JIS-2004	164 236	A4 EC	165 236	A5 EC	142 218	8E DA	166 253	A6 FD		
GB 18030	164 236	A4 EC	165 236	A5 EC	132 49 155 52	84 31 9B 34	129 57 189 56	81 39 BD 38		
EUC-KR / UHC	170 236	AA EC	171 236	AB EC						
Big5 (non-ETEN kana)	198 240	C6 F0	199 166	C7 A6						
Big5 (ETEN / HKSCS)	199 115	C7 73	199 232	C7 E8						

== See also ==
- Japanese phonology
