= Na (kana) =

na

Hiragana	Katakana
- Transliteration: na
- Hiragana origin: 奈
- Katakana origin: 奈
- Man'yōgana: 那 男 奈 南 寧 難 七 名 魚 菜
- Spelling kana: 名古屋のナ (Nagoya no na)
- Unicode: U+306A, U+30CA
- Braille: ⠅

Na (hiragana: な, katakana: ナ) are Japanese kana, which each represent one mora. The hiragana な is made in four strokes, the katakana ナ two. Both represent [na]. な and ナ originate from the man'yōgana 奈. な is used as part of the okurigana for the plain negative forms of Japanese verbs, and several negative forms of adjectives.

Form	Rōmaji	Hiragana	Katakana
Normal n- (な行 na-gyō)	na	な	ナ
Normal n- (な行 na-gyō)	naa nā	なあ, なぁ なー	ナア, ナァ ナー

== Stroke order ==
Stroke order in writing な

Stroke order in writing ナ

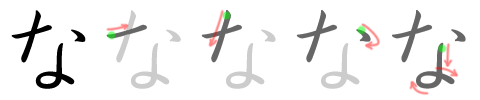
Stroke order in writing な

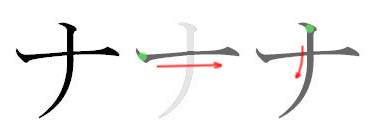
Stroke order in writing ナ

== Other communicative representations ==
Japanese radiotelephony alphabet	Wabun code
名古屋のナ; Nagoya no "Na"	▄ ▄▄▄ ▄

Japanese Navy Signal Flag

Japanese semaphore
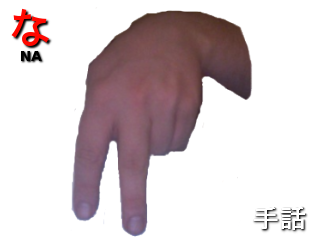
Japanese manual syllabary (fingerspelling)
Braille dots-13
Japanese Braille

=== Braille forms ===
な / ナ in Japanese Braille
な / ナ na	なあ / ナー nā	Other kana based on Braille な	
な / ナ na	なあ / ナー nā	にゃ / ニャ nya	にゃあ / ニャー nyā
⠅ (braille pattern dots-13)	⠅ (braille pattern dots-13) ⠒ (braille pattern dots-25)	⠈ (braille pattern dots-4) ⠅ (braille pattern dots-13)	⠈ (braille pattern dots-4) ⠅ (braille pattern dots-13) ⠒ (braille pattern dots-25)

=== Computer encodings ===
Character information
Preview	な		ナ		ﾅ		㋤	
Unicode name	HIRAGANA LETTER NA		KATAKANA LETTER NA		HALFWIDTH KATAKANA LETTER NA		CIRCLED KATAKANA NA	
Encodings	decimal	hex	dec	hex	dec	hex	dec	hex
Unicode	12394	U+306A	12490	U+30CA	65413	U+FF85	13028	U+32E4
UTF-8	227 129 170	E3 81 AA	227 131 138	E3 83 8A	239 190 133	EF BE 85	227 139 164	E3 8B A4
Numeric character reference	&#12394;	&#x306A;	&#12490;	&#x30CA;	&#65413;	&#xFF85;	&#13028;	&#x32E4;
Shift JIS	130 200	82 C8	131 105	83 69	197	C5		
EUC-JP	164 202	A4 CA	165 202	A5 CA	142 197	8E C5		
GB 18030	164 202	A4 CA	165 202	A5 CA	132 49 153 51	84 31 99 33		
EUC-KR / UHC	170 202	AA CA	171 202	AB CA				
Big5 (non-ETEN kana)	198 206	C6 CE	199 98	C7 62				
Big5 (ETEN / HKSCS)	199 81	C7 51	199 198	C7 C6				
