= Nu (kana) =

nu

Hiragana	Katakana
- Transliteration: nu
- Hiragana origin: 奴
- Katakana origin: 奴
- Man'yōgana: 奴 努 怒 農 濃 沼 宿
- Spelling kana: 沼津のヌ (Numazu no nu)
- Unicode: U+306C, U+30CC
- Braille: ⠍

Nu (hiragana: ぬ, katakana: ヌ) is one of the Japanese kana each representing one mora. Both hiragana and katakana are made in two strokes and represent [nɯ]. They are both derived from the Chinese character 奴. In the Ainu language, katakana ヌ can be written as small ㇴ to represent a final n, and is interchangeable with the standard katakana ン.

Form	Rōmaji	Hiragana	Katakana
Normal n- (な行 na-gyō)	nu	ぬ	ヌ
Normal n- (な行 na-gyō)	nuu, nwu nū	ぬう, ぬぅ ぬー	ヌウ, ヌゥ ヌー

Other additional forms

Form (nw-)
Rōmaji	Hiragana	Katakana
nwa	ぬぁ, ぬゎ	ヌァ, ヌヮ
nwi	ぬぃ	ヌィ
(nwu)	(ぬぅ)	(ヌゥ)
nwe	ぬぇ	ヌェ
nwo	ぬぉ	ヌォ

== Stroke order ==
Stroke order in writing ぬ

Stroke order in writing ヌ

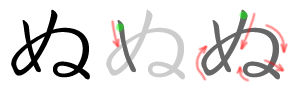
Stroke order in writing ぬ

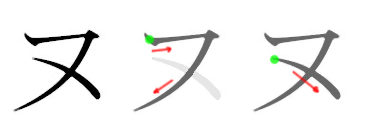
Stroke order in writing ヌ

== Other communicative representations ==
Japanese radiotelephony alphabet	Wabun code
沼津のヌ; Numazu no "Nu"	▄ ▄ ▄ ▄

Japanese Navy Signal Flag

Japanese semaphore
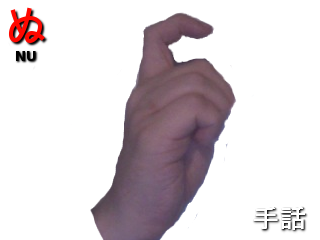
Japanese manual syllabary (fingerspelling)
Braille dots-134
Japanese Braille

=== Braille forms ===
ぬ / ヌ in Japanese Braille
ぬ / ヌ nu	ぬう / ヌー nū	Other kana based on Braille ぬ	
ぬ / ヌ nu	ぬう / ヌー nū	にゅ / ニュ nyu	にゅう / ニュー nyū
⠍ (braille pattern dots-134)	⠍ (braille pattern dots-134) ⠒ (braille pattern dots-25)	⠈ (braille pattern dots-4) ⠍ (braille pattern dots-134)	⠈ (braille pattern dots-4) ⠍ (braille pattern dots-134) ⠒ (braille pattern dots-25)

=== Computer encodings ===
Character information
Preview	ぬ		ヌ		ﾇ		ㇴ		㋦	
Unicode name	HIRAGANA LETTER NU		KATAKANA LETTER NU		HALFWIDTH KATAKANA LETTER NU		KATAKANA LETTER SMALL NU		CIRCLED KATAKANA NU	
Encodings	decimal	hex	dec	hex	dec	hex	dec	hex	dec	hex
Unicode	12396	U+306C	12492	U+30CC	65415	U+FF87	12788	U+31F4	13030	U+32E6
UTF-8	227 129 172	E3 81 AC	227 131 140	E3 83 8C	239 190 135	EF BE 87	227 135 180	E3 87 B4	227 139 166	E3 8B A6
Numeric character reference	&#12396;	&#x306C;	&#12492;	&#x30CC;	&#65415;	&#xFF87;	&#12788;	&#x31F4;	&#13030;	&#x32E6;
Shift JIS (plain)	130 202	82 CA	131 107	83 6B	199	C7				
Shift JIS-2004	130 202	82 CA	131 107	83 6B	199	C7	131 240	83 F0		
EUC-JP (plain)	164 204	A4 CC	165 204	A5 CC	142 199	8E C7				
EUC-JIS-2004	164 204	A4 CC	165 204	A5 CC	142 199	8E C7	166 242	A6 F2		
GB 18030	164 204	A4 CC	165 204	A5 CC	132 49 153 53	84 31 99 35	129 57 188 56	81 39 BC 38		
EUC-KR / UHC	170 204	AA CC	171 204	AB CC						
Big5 (non-ETEN kana)	198 208	C6 D0	199 100	C7 64						
Big5 (ETEN / HKSCS)	199 83	C7 53	199 200	C7 C8						

== In popular culture ==
In the manga "Bobobo-bo Bo-bobo" ぬ is Jelly Jiggler's favorite character.
