= Ta (kana) =

ta

Hiragana	Katakana
- Transliteration: ta
- Translit. with dakuten: da
- Hiragana origin: 太
- Katakana origin: 多
- Man'yōgana: 太 多 他 丹 駄 田 手 立
- Voiced man'yōgana: 陀 太 大 嚢
- Spelling kana: 煙草のタ (Tabako no "ta")

Ta (hiragana: た, katakana: タ) is one of the Japanese kana, which each represent one mora. Both represent [ta]. た originates from the Chinese character 太, while タ originates from 多.

Form	Rōmaji	Hiragana	Katakana
Normal t- (た行 ta-gyō)	ta	た	タ
Normal t- (た行 ta-gyō)	taa tā	たあ, たぁ たー	タア, タァ ター
Addition dakuten d- (だ行 da-gyō)	da	だ	ダ
Addition dakuten d- (だ行 da-gyō)	daa dā	だあ, だぁ だー	ダア, ダァ ダー

== Stroke order ==
Stroke order in writing た

Stroke order in writing タ

Stroke order in writing た

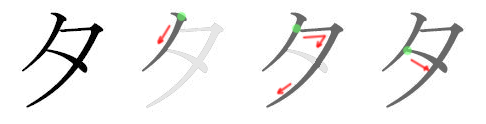
Stroke order in writing タ

== Other communicative representations ==
Japanese radiotelephony alphabet	Wabun code
煙草のタ; Tabako no "Ta"	▄▄▄ ▄

Japanese Navy Signal Flag

Japanese semaphore
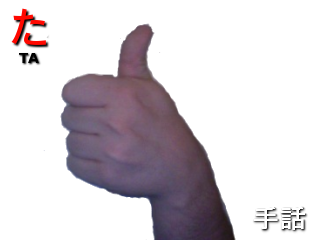
Japanese manual syllabary (fingerspelling)
Braille dots-135
Japanese Braille

=== Braille forms ===
た / タ in Japanese Braille
た / タ ta	だ / ダ da	たあ / ター tā	だあ / ダー dā	Other kana based on Braille た			
た / タ ta	だ / ダ da	たあ / ター tā	だあ / ダー dā	ちゃ / チャ cha	ぢゃ / ヂャ ja/dya	ちゃあ / チャー chā	ぢゃあ / ヂャー jā/dyā
⠕ (braille pattern dots-135)	⠐ (braille pattern dots-5) ⠕ (braille pattern dots-135)	⠕ (braille pattern dots-135) ⠒ (braille pattern dots-25)	⠐ (braille pattern dots-5) ⠕ (braille pattern dots-135) ⠒ (braille pattern dots-25)	⠈ (braille pattern dots-4) ⠕ (braille pattern dots-135)	⠘ (braille pattern dots-45) ⠕ (braille pattern dots-135)	⠈ (braille pattern dots-4) ⠕ (braille pattern dots-135) ⠒ (braille pattern dots-25)	⠘ (braille pattern dots-45) ⠕ (braille pattern dots-135) ⠒ (braille pattern dots-25)

=== Computer encodings ===
Character information
Preview	た		タ		ﾀ		だ		ダ	
Unicode name	HIRAGANA LETTER TA		KATAKANA LETTER TA		HALFWIDTH KATAKANA LETTER TA		HIRAGANA LETTER DA		KATAKANA LETTER DA	
Encodings	decimal	hex	dec	hex	dec	hex	dec	hex	dec	hex
Unicode	12383	U+305F	12479	U+30BF	65408	U+FF80	12384	U+3060	12480	U+30C0
UTF-8	227 129 159	E3 81 9F	227 130 191	E3 82 BF	239 190 128	EF BE 80	227 129 160	E3 81 A0	227 131 128	E3 83 80
Numeric character reference	&#12383;	&#x305F;	&#12479;	&#x30BF;	&#65408;	&#xFF80;	&#12384;	&#x3060;	&#12480;	&#x30C0;
Shift JIS	130 189	82 BD	131 94	83 5E	192	C0	130 190	82 BE	131 95	83 5F
EUC-JP	164 191	A4 BF	165 191	A5 BF	142 192	8E C0	164 192	A4 C0	165 192	A5 C0
GB 18030	164 191	A4 BF	165 191	A5 BF	132 49 152 56	84 31 98 38	164 192	A4 C0	165 192	A5 C0
EUC-KR / UHC	170 191	AA BF	171 191	AB BF			170 192	AA C0	171 192	AB C0
Big5 (non-ETEN kana)	198 195	C6 C3	199 87	C7 57			198 196	C6 C4	199 88	C7 58
Big5 (ETEN / HKSCS)	199 70	C7 46	199 187	C7 BB			199 71	C7 47	199 188	C7 BC

Character information
Preview	㋟	
Unicode name	CIRCLED KATAKANA TA	
Encodings	decimal	hex
Unicode	13023	U+32DF
UTF-8	227 139 159	E3 8B 9F
Numeric character reference	&#13023;	&#x32DF;
