= Wa (kana) =

wa

Hiragana	Katakana
- Transliteration: wa
- Hiragana origin: 和
- Katakana origin: 和
- Man'yōgana: 和 丸 輪
- Spelling kana: わらびのワ Warabi no "wa"
- Unicode: U+308F, U+30EF
- Braille: ⠄

Wa (hiragana: わ, katakana: ワ) is one of the Japanese kana, which each represent one mora. It represents [wa] and has origins in the character 和. There is also a small ゎ/ヮ, that is used to write the morae /kwa/ and /gwa/ (くゎ, ぐゎ), which are almost obsolete in contemporary standard Japanese but still exist in the Ryukyuan languages. A few loanwords such as shīkwāsā (シークヮーサー; from Okinawan language) and Musica Antiqua Köln (ムジカ・アンティクヮ・ケルン, Mujika Antikwa Kerun; a German early music group) contain this kana in Japanese. Katakana ワ is also sometimes written with dakuten, ヷ, to represent a /va/ sound in foreign words; however, most IMEs lack a convenient way to write this. It is far more common to represent the /va/ sound with the digraph ヴァ.

Form	Rōmaji	Hiragana	Katakana
Normal w- (わ行 wa-gyō)	wa	わ	ワ
Normal w- (わ行 wa-gyō)	waa wā	わあ わー	ワア ワー

The kana は (ha) is read as "wa" when it represents a particle.

The katakana va (ヷ), which is a wa with a dakuten ("voiced mark"), along with vu (ヴ), was first used by the educator Fukuzawa Yukichi for transcribing English in 1860 in his English-Japanese dictionary, which featured such entries as Heaven(ヒーヴヌ) (Hīvunu), Venus(ヴェヌス) (Venusu), River(リーヷル) (Rīvaru), etc. It is intended to represent a voiced labiodental fricative [v] in foreign languages, but the actual pronunciation by Japanese speakers may be closer to a voiced bilabial fricative [β] (see Japanese phonology § Voiced bilabial fricative).

== Stroke order ==
Stroke order in writing わ

Stroke order in writing ワ

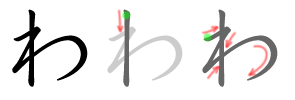
Stroke order in writing わ

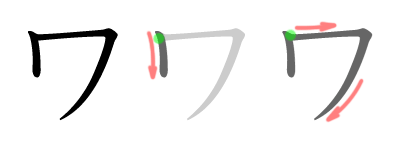
Stroke order in writing ワ

== Other communicative representations ==
Japanese radiotelephony alphabet	Wabun code
わらびのワ; Warabi no "Wa"	▄▄▄ ▄ ▄▄▄

Japanese Navy Signal Flag

Japanese semaphore

Japanese manual syllabary (fingerspelling)
Braille dots-3
Japanese Braille

=== Braille forms ===
わ / ワ in Japanese Braille
わ / ワ wa	ヷ va	わあ / ワー wā	ヷー vā
⠄ (braille pattern dots-3)	⠐ (braille pattern dots-5) ⠄ (braille pattern dots-3)	⠄ (braille pattern dots-3) ⠒ (braille pattern dots-25)	⠐ (braille pattern dots-5) ⠄ (braille pattern dots-3) ⠒ (braille pattern dots-25)

=== Computer encodings ===
Character information
Preview	わ		ワ		ﾜ		🋀	
Unicode name	HIRAGANA LETTER WA		KATAKANA LETTER WA		HALFWIDTH KATAKANA LETTER WA		HALFWIDTH KATAKANA LETTER SMALL WA	
Encodings	decimal	hex	dec	hex	dec	hex	dec	hex
Unicode	12431	U+308F	12527	U+30EF	65436	U+FF9C	127680	U+1F2C0
UTF-8	227 130 143	E3 82 8F	227 131 175	E3 83 AF	239 190 156	EF BE 9C	240 159 139 128	F0 9F 8B 80
UTF-16	12431	308F	12527	30EF	65436	FF9C	55356 57024	D83C DEC0
Numeric character reference	&#12431;	&#x308F;	&#12527;	&#x30EF;	&#65436;	&#xFF9C;	&#127680;	&#x1F2C0;
Shift JIS	130 237	82 ED	131 143	83 8F	220	DC		
EUC-JP	164 239	A4 EF	165 239	A5 EF	142 220	8E DC		
GB 18030	164 239	A4 EF	165 239	A5 EF	132 49 155 54	84 31 9B 36		
EUC-KR / UHC	170 239	AA EF	171 239	AB EF				
Big5 (non-ETEN kana)	198 243	C6 F3	199 169	C7 A9				
Big5 (ETEN / HKSCS)	199 118	C7 76	199 235	C7 EB				

Character information
Preview	ゎ		ヮ		ヷ		㋻	
Unicode name	HIRAGANA LETTER SMALL WA		KATAKANA LETTER SMALL WA		KATAKANA LETTER VA		CIRCLED KATAKANA WA	
Encodings	decimal	hex	dec	hex	dec	hex	dec	hex
Unicode	12430	U+308E	12526	U+30EE	12535	U+30F7	13051	U+32FB
UTF-8	227 130 142	E3 82 8E	227 131 174	E3 83 AE	227 131 183	E3 83 B7	227 139 187	E3 8B BB
Numeric character reference	&#12430;	&#x308E;	&#12526;	&#x30EE;	&#12535;	&#x30F7;	&#13051;	&#x32FB;
Shift JIS (plain)	130 236	82 EC	131 142	83 8E				
Shift JIS (KanjiTalk 7)	130 236	82 EC	131 142	83 8E	136 106	88 6A		
Shift JIS-2004	130 236	82 EC	131 142	83 8E	132 146	84 92		
EUC-JP (plain)	164 238	A4 EE	165 238	A5 EE				
EUC-JIS-2004	164 238	A4 EE	165 238	A5 EE	167 242	A7 F2		
GB 18030	164 238	A4 EE	165 238	A5 EE	129 57 167 53	81 39 A7 35		
EUC-KR / UHC	170 238	AA EE	171 238	AB EE				
Big5 (non-ETEN kana)	198 242	C6 F2	199 168	C7 A8				
Big5 (ETEN / HKSCS)	199 117	C7 75	199 234	C7 EA				
