= Ma (kana) =

ma

| Hiragana | Katakana |
- Transliteration: ma
- Hiragana origin: 末
- Katakana origin: 末
- Man'yōgana: 万 末 馬 麻 摩 磨 満 前 真 間 鬼
- Spelling kana: マッチのマ Matchi no "ma"
- Unicode: U+307E, U+30DE
- Braille: ⠵

Ma (hiragana: ま, katakana: マ) is one of the Japanese kana, which each represent one mora. The hiragana is made in three strokes, while the katakana in two. Both represent [ma]. The characters ま and マ are respectively based on the sōsho style and simplification of the kanji 末.

| Form | Rōmaji | Hiragana | Katakana |
|---|---|---|---|
| Normal m- (ま行 ma-gyō) | ma | ま | マ |
| Normal m- (ま行 ma-gyō) | maa mā | まあ, まぁ まー | マア, マァ マー |

== Stroke order ==
Stroke order in writing ま

Stroke order in writing マ

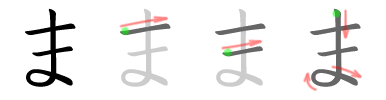
Stroke order in writing ま

The hiragana ま is made with three strokes:

1. An upper horizontal line from left to right.
2. Another horizontal line going from left to right under the first stroke.
3. A vertical line from top to bottom, then a small loop towards the left, which then crosses the vertical line going to the right.

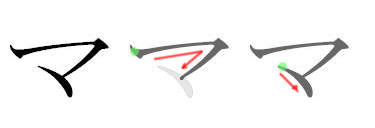
Stroke order in writing マ

The katakana マ is made with two strokes:

1. A horizontal line from left to right, accompanied with a diagonal line towards the bottom-left.
2. A small line at the end of the diagonal line.

== Other communicative representations ==
| Japanese radiotelephony alphabet | Wabun code |
| マッチのマ; Matchi no "Ma" | ▄▄▄ ▄ ▄ ▄▄▄ |

Japanese Navy Signal Flag

Japanese semaphore
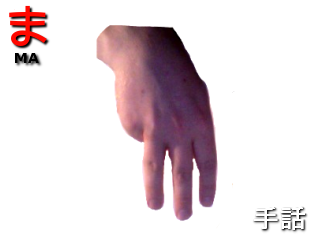
Japanese manual syllabary (fingerspelling)
Braille dots-1356
Japanese Braille

=== Braille forms ===
ま / マ in Japanese Braille
| ま / マ ma | まあ / マー mā | Other kana based on Braille ま | |
| ま / マ ma | まあ / マー mā | みゃ / ミャ mya | みゃあ / ミャー myā |
| ⠵ (braille pattern dots-1356) | ⠵ (braille pattern dots-1356) ⠒ (braille pattern dots-25) | ⠈ (braille pattern dots-4) ⠵ (braille pattern dots-1356) | ⠈ (braille pattern dots-4) ⠵ (braille pattern dots-1356) ⠒ (braille pattern dots-25) |

=== Computer encodings ===
Character information
| Preview | ま | | マ | | ﾏ | | ㋮ | |
|---|---|---|---|---|---|---|---|---|
| Unicode name | HIRAGANA LETTER MA | | KATAKANA LETTER MA | | HALFWIDTH KATAKANA LETTER MA | | CIRCLED KATAKANA MA | |
| Encodings | decimal | hex | dec | hex | dec | hex | dec | hex |
| Unicode | 12414 | U+307E | 12510 | U+30DE | 65423 | U+FF8F | 13038 | U+32EE |
| UTF-8 | 227 129 190 | E3 81 BE | 227 131 158 | E3 83 9E | 239 190 143 | EF BE 8F | 227 139 174 | E3 8B AE |
| Numeric character reference | &#12414; | &#x307E; | &#12510; | &#x30DE; | &#65423; | &#xFF8F; | &#13038; | &#x32EE; |
| Shift JIS | 130 220 | 82 DC | 131 125 | 83 7D | 207 | CF | | |
| EUC-JP | 164 222 | A4 DE | 165 222 | A5 DE | 142 207 | 8E CF | | |
| GB 18030 | 164 222 | A4 DE | 165 222 | A5 DE | 132 49 154 51 | 84 31 9A 33 | | |
| EUC-KR / UHC | 170 222 | AA DE | 171 222 | AB DE | | | | |
| Big5 (non-ETEN kana) | 198 226 | C6 E2 | 199 118 | C7 76 | | | | |
| Big5 (ETEN / HKSCS) | 199 101 | C7 65 | 199 218 | C7 DA | | | | |
