= Ne (kana) =

ne

Hiragana	Katakana
- Transliteration: ne
- Hiragana origin: 祢
- Katakana origin: 祢
- Man'yōgana: 禰 尼 泥 年 根 宿
- Spelling kana: ねずみのネ (Nezumi no ne)
- Unicode: U+306D, U+30CD
- Braille: ⠏

Ne (hiragana: ね, katakana: ネ) is one of the Japanese kana, each of which represents one mora. The hiragana is made in two strokes, while the katakana is made in four. Both represent [ne].

As a particle, it is used at the end of a sentence, equivalent to an English, "right?" or "isn't it?" It is also used as slang in Japan to get someone's attention, the English equivalent being "hey" or "hey, you."

Form	Rōmaji	Hiragana	Katakana
Normal n- (な行 na-gyō)	ne	ね	ネ
Normal n- (な行 na-gyō)	nei nee nē	ねい, ねぃ ねえ, ねぇ ねー	ネイ, ネィ ネエ, ネェ ネー

== Stroke order ==
Stroke order in writing ね

Stroke order in writing ネ

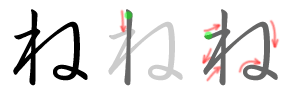
Stroke order in writing ね

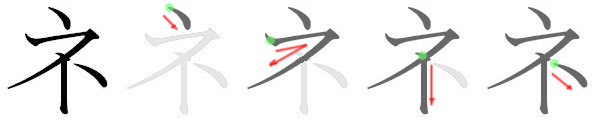
Stroke order in writing ネ

== Other communicative representations ==
Japanese radiotelephony alphabet	Wabun code
ねずみのネ; Nezumi no "Ne"	▄▄▄ ▄▄▄ ▄ ▄▄▄

Japanese Navy Signal Flag

Japanese semaphore
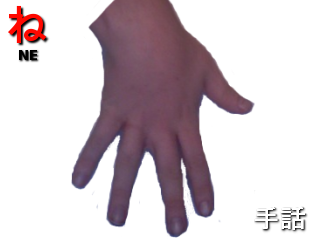
Japanese manual syllabary (fingerspelling)
Braille dots-1234
Japanese Braille

=== Braille forms ===
ね / ネ in Japanese Braille
ね / ネ ne	ねい / ネー nē/nei
⠏ (braille pattern dots-1234)	⠏ (braille pattern dots-1234) ⠒ (braille pattern dots-25)

=== Computer encodings ===
Character information
Preview	ね		ネ		ﾈ		㋧	
Unicode name	HIRAGANA LETTER NE		KATAKANA LETTER NE		HALFWIDTH KATAKANA LETTER NE		CIRCLED KATAKANA NE	
Encodings	decimal	hex	dec	hex	dec	hex	dec	hex
Unicode	12397	U+306D	12493	U+30CD	65416	U+FF88	13031	U+32E7
UTF-8	227 129 173	E3 81 AD	227 131 141	E3 83 8D	239 190 136	EF BE 88	227 139 167	E3 8B A7
Numeric character reference	&#12397;	&#x306D;	&#12493;	&#x30CD;	&#65416;	&#xFF88;	&#13031;	&#x32E7;
Shift JIS	130 203	82 CB	131 108	83 6C	200	C8		
EUC-JP	164 205	A4 CD	165 205	A5 CD	142 200	8E C8		
GB 18030	164 205	A4 CD	165 205	A5 CD	132 49 153 54	84 31 99 36		
EUC-KR / UHC	170 205	AA CD	171 205	AB CD				
Big5 (non-ETEN kana)	198 209	C6 D1	199 101	C7 65				
Big5 (ETEN / HKSCS)	199 84	C7 54	199 201	C7 C9				

==== Archaic forms ====
A second katakana ne, derived from the kanji 子, was used alongside ネ in Meiji-period textbooks and dictionaries, with attestations into the 1930s; it survives in personal names such as Kane Tanaka's (田中カ子), where the kanji 子 has stood in for it. Unicode 18.0 (September 2026) encoded it as U+1B127 KATAKANA LETTER ALTERNATE NE.

Character information
Preview	𛄧	
Unicode name	KATAKANA LETTER ALTERNATE NE	
Encodings	decimal	hex
Unicode	110887	U+1B127
UTF-8	240 155 132 167	F0 9B 84 A7
UTF-16	55340 56615	D82C DD27
Numeric character reference	&#110887;	&#x1B127;

== In popular culture ==
In the manga "Bobobo-bo Bo-bobo" ね is Jelly Jiggler's least favorite kana.
