= Ku (kana) =

ku

| Hiragana | Katakana |
- Transliteration: ku
- Translit. with dakuten: gu
- Translit. with handakuten: (ngu)
- Hiragana origin: 久
- Katakana origin: 久
- Man'yōgana: 久 九 口 丘 苦 鳩 来
- Voiced man'yōgana: 具 遇 隅 求 愚 虞
- Spelling kana: クラブのク (Kurabu no "ku")

Ku (hiragana: く, katakana: ク) is one of the Japanese kana, which each represent one mora. Both represent [kɯ] and their shapes come from the kanji 久.

This kana may have a dakuten added, transforming it into ぐ in hiragana, グ in katakana and gu in Hepburn romanization. The dakuten's addition also changes the sound of the mora represented, to [ɡɯ] in initial positions and varying between [ŋɯ] and [ɣɯ] in the middle of words.

A handakuten (゜) does not occur with ku in normal Japanese text, but it may be used by linguists to indicate a nasal pronunciation [ŋɯ].

In the Ainu language, the katakana ク can be written as small ㇰ, representing a final k sound as in アイヌイタㇰ Ainu itak (Ainu language). This was developed along with other extended katakana to represent sounds in Ainu that are not found in standard Japanese katakana.

| Forms | Rōmaji | Hiragana | Katakana |
|---|---|---|---|
| Normal k- (か行 ka-gyō) | ku | く | ク |
| Normal k- (か行 ka-gyō) | kuu, kwu kū | くう, くぅ くー | クウ, クゥ クー |
| Addition dakuten g- (が行 ga-gyō) | gu | ぐ | グ |
| Addition dakuten g- (が行 ga-gyō) | guu, gwu gū | ぐう, ぐぅ ぐー | グウ, グゥ グー |

Other additional forms

Form A (kw-)
| Romaji | Hiragana | Katakana |
|---|---|---|
| kwa | くぁ, くゎ | クァ, クヮ |
| kwi | くぃ | クィ |
| (kwu) | (くぅ) | (クゥ) |
| kwe | くぇ | クェ |
| kwo | くぉ | クォ |

Form B (gw-)
| Romaji | Hiragana | Katakana |
|---|---|---|
| gwa | ぐぁ, ぐゎ | グァ, グヮ |
| gwi | ぐぃ | グィ |
| (gwu) | (ぐぅ) | (グゥ) |
| gwe | ぐぇ | グェ |
| gwo | ぐぉ | グォ |

== Stroke order ==
Stroke order in writing く

1

Stroke order in writing ク

2

Stroke order in writing く

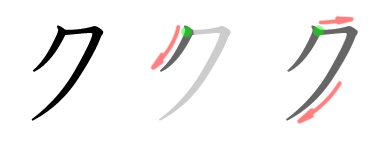
Stroke order in writing ク

== Other communicative representations ==
| Japanese radiotelephony alphabet | Wabun code |
| クラブのク; Kurabu no "Ku" | ▄ ▄ ▄ ▄▄▄ |

Japanese Navy Signal Flag

Japanese semaphore
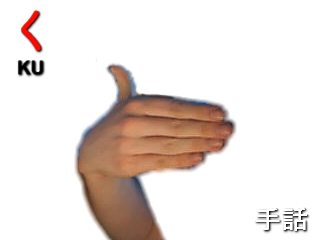
Japanese manual syllabary (fingerspelling)
Braille dots-146
Japanese Braille

=== Braille forms ===
く / ク in Japanese Braille
| く / ク ku | ぐ / グ gu | くう / クー kū | ぐう / グー gū | Other kana based on Braille く | | | |
| く / ク ku | ぐ / グ gu | くう / クー kū | ぐう / グー gū | きゅ / キュ kyu | ぎゅ / ギュ gyu | きゅう / キュー kyū | ぎゅう / ギュー gyū |
| ⠩ (braille pattern dots-146) | ⠐ (braille pattern dots-5) ⠩ (braille pattern dots-146) | ⠩ (braille pattern dots-146) ⠒ (braille pattern dots-25) | ⠐ (braille pattern dots-5) ⠩ (braille pattern dots-146) ⠒ (braille pattern dots-25) | ⠈ (braille pattern dots-4) ⠩ (braille pattern dots-146) | ⠘ (braille pattern dots-45) ⠩ (braille pattern dots-146) | ⠈ (braille pattern dots-4) ⠩ (braille pattern dots-146) ⠒ (braille pattern dots-25) | ⠘ (braille pattern dots-45) ⠩ (braille pattern dots-146) ⠒ (braille pattern dots-25) |

=== Computer encodings ===
Character information
| Preview | く | | ク | | ｸ | | ㇰ | | ㋗ | |
|---|---|---|---|---|---|---|---|---|---|---|
| Unicode name | HIRAGANA LETTER KU | | KATAKANA LETTER KU | | HALFWIDTH KATAKANA LETTER KU | | KATAKANA LETTER SMALL KU | | CIRCLED KATAKANA KU | |
| Encodings | decimal | hex | dec | hex | dec | hex | dec | hex | dec | hex |
| Unicode | 12367 | U+304F | 12463 | U+30AF | 65400 | U+FF78 | 12784 | U+31F0 | 13015 | U+32D7 |
| UTF-8 | 227 129 143 | E3 81 8F | 227 130 175 | E3 82 AF | 239 189 184 | EF BD B8 | 227 135 176 | E3 87 B0 | 227 139 151 | E3 8B 97 |
| Numeric character reference | &#12367; | &#x304F; | &#12463; | &#x30AF; | &#65400; | &#xFF78; | &#12784; | &#x31F0; | &#13015; | &#x32D7; |
| Shift JIS (plain) | 130 173 | 82 AD | 131 78 | 83 4E | 184 | B8 | | | | |
| Shift JIS-2004 | 130 173 | 82 AD | 131 78 | 83 4E | 184 | B8 | 131 236 | 83 EC | | |
| EUC-JP (plain) | 164 175 | A4 AF | 165 175 | A5 AF | 142 184 | 8E B8 | | | | |
| EUC-JIS-2004 | 164 175 | A4 AF | 165 175 | A5 AF | 142 184 | 8E B8 | 166 238 | A6 EE | | |
| GB 18030 | 164 175 | A4 AF | 165 175 | A5 AF | 132 49 152 48 | 84 31 98 30 | 129 57 188 52 | 81 39 BC 34 | | |
| EUC-KR / UHC | 170 175 | AA AF | 171 175 | AB AF | | | | | | |
| Big5 (non-ETEN kana) | 198 179 | C6 B3 | 199 71 | C7 47 | | | | | | |
| Big5 (ETEN / HKSCS) | 198 245 | C6 F5 | 199 171 | C7 AB | | | | | | |

Character information
| Preview | ぐ | | グ | | く゚ | | ク゚ | |
|---|---|---|---|---|---|---|---|---|
| Unicode name | HIRAGANA LETTER GU | | KATAKANA LETTER GU | | HIRAGANA LETTER BIDAKUON NGU | | KATAKANA LETTER BIDAKUON NGU | |
| Encodings | decimal | hex | dec | hex | dec | hex | dec | hex |
| Unicode | 12368 | U+3050 | 12464 | U+30B0 | 12367 12442 | U+304F+309A | 12463 12442 | U+30AF+309A |
| UTF-8 | 227 129 144 | E3 81 90 | 227 130 176 | E3 82 B0 | 227 129 143 227 130 154 | E3 81 8F E3 82 9A | 227 130 175 227 130 154 | E3 82 AF E3 82 9A |
| Numeric character reference | &#12368; | &#x3050; | &#12464; | &#x30B0; | &#12367;&#12442; | &#x304F;&#x309A; | &#12463;&#12442; | &#x30AF;&#x309A; |
| Shift JIS (plain) | 130 174 | 82 AE | 131 79 | 83 4F | | | | |
| Shift JIS-2004 | 130 174 | 82 AE | 131 79 | 83 4F | 130 247 | 82 F7 | 131 153 | 83 99 |
| EUC-JP (plain) | 164 176 | A4 B0 | 165 176 | A5 B0 | | | | |
| EUC-JIS-2004 | 164 176 | A4 B0 | 165 176 | A5 B0 | 164 249 | A4 F9 | 165 249 | A5 F9 |
| GB 18030 | 164 176 | A4 B0 | 165 176 | A5 B0 | | | | |
| EUC-KR / UHC | 170 176 | AA B0 | 171 176 | AB B0 | | | | |
| Big5 (non-ETEN kana) | 198 180 | C6 B4 | 199 72 | C7 48 | | | | |
| Big5 (ETEN / HKSCS) | 198 246 | C6 F6 | 199 172 | C7 AC | | | | |
