= Sa (kana) =

sa

Hiragana	Katakana
- Transliteration: sa
- Translit. with dakuten: za
- Hiragana origin: 左
- Katakana origin: 散
- Man'yōgana: 左 佐 沙 作 者 柴 紗 草 散
- Voiced man'yōgana: 社 射 謝 耶 奢 装 蔵
- Spelling kana: 桜のサ (Sakura no "sa")

Sa (hiragana: さ, katakana: サ) is one of the Japanese kana, which each represent one mora. Both represent [sa]. The shapes of these kana originate from 左 and 散, respectively.

Like き, the hiragana character may be written with or without linking the lower line to the rest of the character.

The character may be combined with a dakuten, changing it into ざ in hiragana, ザ in katakana, and za in Hepburn romanization. The pronunciation is also changed, to [za].

Form	Rōmaji	Hiragana	Katakana
Normal s- (さ行 sa-gyō)	sa	さ	サ
Normal s- (さ行 sa-gyō)	saa sā	さあ, さぁ さー	サア, サァ サー
Addition dakuten z- (ざ行 za-gyō)	za	ざ	ザ
Addition dakuten z- (ざ行 za-gyō)	zaa zā	ざあ, ざぁ ざー	ザア, ザァ ザー

== Stroke order ==
Stroke order in writing さ

2, 3

Stroke order in writing サ

3

Stroke order in writing さ

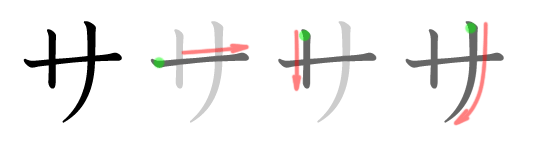
Stroke order in writing サ

== Other communicative representations ==
Japanese radiotelephony alphabet	Wabun code
桜のサ; Sakura no "Sa"	▄▄▄ ▄ ▄▄▄ ▄ ▄▄▄

Japanese Navy Signal Flag

Japanese semaphore
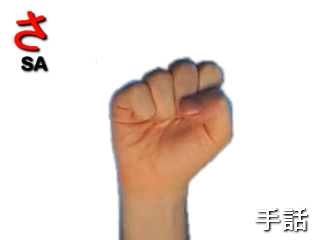
Japanese manual syllabary (fingerspelling)
Braille dots-156
Japanese Braille

=== Braille forms ===
さ / サ in Japanese Braille
さ / サ sa	ざ / ザ za	さあ / サー sā	ざあ / ザー zā	Other kana based on Braille さ			
さ / サ sa	ざ / ザ za	さあ / サー sā	ざあ / ザー zā	しゃ / シャ sha	じゃ / ジャ ja	しゃあ / シャー shā	じゃあ / ジャー jā
⠱ (braille pattern dots-156)	⠐ (braille pattern dots-5) ⠱ (braille pattern dots-156)	⠱ (braille pattern dots-156) ⠒ (braille pattern dots-25)	⠐ (braille pattern dots-5) ⠱ (braille pattern dots-156) ⠒ (braille pattern dots-25)	⠈ (braille pattern dots-4) ⠱ (braille pattern dots-156)	⠘ (braille pattern dots-45) ⠱ (braille pattern dots-156)	⠈ (braille pattern dots-4) ⠱ (braille pattern dots-156) ⠒ (braille pattern dots-25)	⠘ (braille pattern dots-45) ⠱ (braille pattern dots-156) ⠒ (braille pattern dots-25)

=== Computer encodings ===
Character information
Preview	さ		サ		ｻ		ざ		ザ	
Unicode name	HIRAGANA LETTER SA		KATAKANA LETTER SA		HALFWIDTH KATAKANA LETTER SA		HIRAGANA LETTER ZA		KATAKANA LETTER ZA	
Encodings	decimal	hex	dec	hex	dec	hex	dec	hex	dec	hex
Unicode	12373	U+3055	12469	U+30B5	65403	U+FF7B	12374	U+3056	12470	U+30B6
UTF-8	227 129 149	E3 81 95	227 130 181	E3 82 B5	239 189 187	EF BD BB	227 129 150	E3 81 96	227 130 182	E3 82 B6
Numeric character reference	&#12373;	&#x3055;	&#12469;	&#x30B5;	&#65403;	&#xFF7B;	&#12374;	&#x3056;	&#12470;	&#x30B6;
Shift JIS	130 179	82 B3	131 84	83 54	187	BB	130 180	82 B4	131 85	83 55
EUC-JP	164 181	A4 B5	165 181	A5 B5	142 187	8E BB	164 182	A4 B6	165 182	A5 B6
GB 18030	164 181	A4 B5	165 181	A5 B5	132 49 152 51	84 31 98 33	164 182	A4 B6	165 182	A5 B6
EUC-KR / UHC	170 181	AA B5	171 181	AB B5			170 182	AA B6	171 182	AB B6
Big5 (non-ETEN kana)	198 185	C6 B9	199 77	C7 4D			198 186	C6 BA	199 78	C7 4E
Big5 (ETEN / HKSCS)	198 251	C6 FB	199 177	C7 B1			198 252	C6 FC	199 178	C7 B2

Character information
Preview	㋚		🈂	
Unicode name	CIRCLED KATAKANA SA		SQUARED KATAKANA SA	
Encodings	decimal	hex	dec	hex
Unicode	13018	U+32DA	127490	U+1F202
UTF-8	227 139 154	E3 8B 9A	240 159 136 130	F0 9F 88 82
UTF-16	13018	32DA	55356 56834	D83C DE02
Numeric character reference	&#13018;	&#x32DA;	&#127490;	&#x1F202;
Shift JIS (au by KDDI)			243 90	F3 5A
Shift JIS (SoftBank 3G)			247 200	F7 C8
7-bit JIS (au by KDDI)			121 59	79 3B
GB 18030	129 57 210 54	81 39 D2 36	148 57 150 52	94 39 96 34
Emoji shortcode			:sa:	
