= Japanese Navy Signal Flags =

Set of maritime signal flags used by the JMSDF

The Japanese Navy Signal Flags are a set of maritime signal flags for conveying messages in the Japanese language. The system generally uses the standard International Signal Flags, assigning both the letter, number and repeater flags to various kana, roughly following Iroha order for the standard letter flags. It also has several unique flags for some kana, as well as for conveying non-alphabetic messages.

ICS name	Japanese Navy name	Flag	Kana	Wabun code
Alfa	Gozen		い / イ "I"	▄ ▄▄▄
Bravo	Aka (red)		は / ハ "Ha"	▄▄▄ ▄ ▄ ▄
Charlie	Sisu		に / ニ "Ni"	▄▄▄ ▄ ▄▄▄ ▄
Delta	Teshiki		ほ / ホ "Ho"	▄▄▄ ▄ ▄
Echo	Isuto		へ / ヘ "He"	▄
Foxtrot	Efu		ち / チ "Chi"	▄ ▄ ▄▄▄ ▄
Golf	Shairo		り / リ "Ri"	▄▄▄ ▄▄▄ ▄
Hotel	Takaso		ぬ / ヌ "Nu"	▄ ▄ ▄ ▄
India	Takuten		Dakuten	▄ ▄
Juliet				Wabun code "Wo" = J Morse ( ▄ ▄▄▄ ▄▄▄ ▄▄▄ )
Kilo	Ke		わ / ワ "Wa"	▄▄▄ ▄ ▄▄▄
Lima	Eru		か / カ "Ka"	▄ ▄▄▄ ▄ ▄
Mike			よ / ヨ "Yo"	▄▄▄ ▄▄▄
November	Kiroren		た / タ "Ta"	▄▄▄ ▄
Oscar	Oba		れ / レ "Re"	▄▄▄ ▄▄▄ ▄▄▄
Papa			つ / ツ "Tsu"	▄ ▄▄▄ ▄▄▄ ▄
Quebec	Kina		ね / ネ "Ne"	▄▄▄ ▄▄▄ ▄ ▄▄▄
Romeo	Aru		な / ナ "Na"	▄ ▄▄▄ ▄
Sierra	Kigan		ら / ラ "Ra"	▄ ▄ ▄
Tango	Tebu		む / ム "Mu"	▄▄▄
Uniform	Yu		う / ウ "U"	▄ ▄ ▄▄▄
Victor	But		く / ク "Ku"	▄ ▄ ▄ ▄▄▄
Whiskey	Tafuryu		せ / セ "Se"	▄ ▄▄▄ ▄▄▄ ▄▄▄ ▄ Does not match "W" in Morse code. Morse code "W" = "Ya" in Wabun code.
Xray	Etsukusu		ま / マ "Ma"	▄▄▄ ▄ ▄ ▄▄▄
Yankee	Wai		け / ケ "Ke"	▄▄▄ ▄ ▄▄▄ ▄▄▄
Zulu	Zetsuto		ふ / フ "Fu"	▄▄▄ ▄▄▄ ▄ ▄
Repeater 1	Seido		ろ / ロ "Ro"	▄ ▄▄▄ ▄ ▄▄▄ No Morse representation
Repeater 2	Bango		ん / ン "N"	▄ ▄▄▄ ▄ ▄▄▄ ▄ No Morse representation
Repeater 3	Sankai		さ / サ "Sa"	▄▄▄ ▄ ▄▄▄ ▄ ▄▄▄ No Morse representation
None	Houku		し / シ "Shi"	▄▄▄ ▄▄▄ ▄ ▄▄▄ ▄
None	Jinkei		ゆ / ユ "Yu"	▄▄▄ ▄ ▄ ▄▄▄ ▄▄▄
None	Undo		と / ト "To"	▄ ▄ ▄▄▄ ▄ ▄
None	Taiban			
None	Rekkon		る / ル "Ru"	▄▄▄ ▄ ▄▄▄ ▄▄▄ ▄
Pennant 4	Sentai		お / オ "O"	▄ ▄▄▄ ▄ ▄ ▄ Does not match "4" in Morse code
