= GB 12052 =

Korean-language character set in China

- Languages: Korean (Hangul) (Note: Although a very small number of Hanja which are absent from GB 2312 or GB 12345 are included in GB 12052, supporting an appreciable number of Hanja would require an encoding combining GB 12052 and either GB 2312 or GB 12345.); English; Russian; Bulgarian; Partial support: Greek (Note: Missing Greek diacritics and final sigma.); Japanese (Note: Kana only; missing chōonpu.)
- Standard: GB 12052
- Current status: Unihan source
- Classification: ISO-2022-compatible DBCS, CJK encoding
- Based on: GB 2312
- Encoding formats: Theoretically ISO 2022, but has no registered escape sequence, and does not appear in any EUC profile.
- Succeeded by: GB 18030
- Other related encodings: Other Hangul ISO 2022 DBCSes: KPS 9566; KS X 1001; Other CJK ISO 2022 DBCSes: JIS X 0208; GB 2312

GB 12052-89, entitled Korean character coded character set for information interchange (Chinese: 信息交换用朝鲜文字编码字符集), is a character set standard established by China for the Korean language in China. It consists of a total of 5,979 characters, and has no relationship nor compatibility with South Korea's KS X 1001 and North Korea's KPS 9566.

== Characters ==
Characters in GB 12052 are arranged in a 94×94 grid (as in ISO/IEC 2022), and the two-byte code point of each character is expressed in the qu-wei form, which specifies a row (qu 区) and the position of the character within the row (cell, wei 位).

The rows (numbered from 1 to 94) contain characters as follows:

- 01–09: identical to GB 2312, except 03-04 (￥ in GB 2312, ＄ in GB 12052)
- 16–37: modern Hangul syllables and jamo, level 1 (2,017 syllables and 51 jamo)
- 38–52: modern Hangul syllables, level 2 (1,356 characters)
- 53–72: archaic Hangul syllables and jamo (1,683 syllables and 96 jamo), and 94 Chinese characters

The rows 10–15 and 73–94 are unassigned.

== Errors ==
There are some errors in the standard:

- 41-64: 믃 in the fold-out table, 믌 in the standard proper – should be 믃
- 46-65: 틘 in the fold-out table, 퇸 in the standard proper – should be 틘
- 49-37: 뗸 in the fold-out table, 뎬 in the standard proper – should be 뗸
- 51-82: 윹 in the fold-out table, 율 in the standard proper – should be 윹
- 53-67: ᄀᆈ in the fold-out table, missing in the standard proper – should be ᄀᆈ
- 72-88: missing in the fold-out table, 夞 in the standard proper – should be 夞

== Precomposed modern Hangul sets ==
Unlike KS X 1001 and KPS 9566, GB 12052

- does not encode jamo in a separate section (see row 4 of KS X 1001 and row 4 of KPS 9566).
- has two levels of precomposed modern Hangul syllables.

However, like KS X 1001, GB 12052 lacks the initial+vowel counterparts for some initial+vowel+final syllables:

- 땩, 땬, 땽: missing 땨
- 뗙, 뗜, 뗨, 뗩, 뗭: missing 뗘
- 뗸, 똉: missing 뗴
- 뚁: missing 뚀
- 뚼: missing 뚸
- 뼹: missing 뼤
- 쪤, 쪵: missing 쪠

=== Level 1 (rows number 16 through 37) ===
GB 12052 (jamo and precomposed modern Hangul syllables, level 1)
	0	1	2	3	4	5	6	7	8	9	A	B	C	D	E	F
302x/B0Ax		ㄱ 3131	ㄳ 3133	가 AC00	각 AC01	간 AC04	갇 AC07	갈 AC08	갉 AC09	갊 AC0A	감 AC10	갑 AC11	값 AC12	갓 AC13	강 AC15	갖 AC16
303x/B0Bx	갗 AC17	같 AC19	갚 AC1A	갛 AC1B	갔 AC14	갸 AC38	걀 AC40	거 AC70	걱 AC71	건 AC74	걷 AC77	걸 AC78	걺 AC7A	검 AC80	겁 AC81	것 AC83
304x/B0Cx	겅 AC85	겆 AC86	겉 AC89	겊 AC8A	겋 AC8B	겨 ACA8	격 ACA9	견 ACAC	겯 ACAF	결 ACB0	겸 ACB8	겹 ACB9	겻 ACBB	경 ACBD	곁 ACC1	겪 ACAA
305x/B0Dx	겼 ACBC	고 ACE0	곡 ACE1	곤 ACE4	곧 ACE7	골 ACE8	곪 ACEA	곬 ACEC	곯 ACEF	곰 ACF0	곱 ACF1	곳 ACF3	공 ACF5	곶 ACF6	곺 ACFA	교 AD50
306x/B0Ex	굔 AD54	굘 AD58	굡 AD61	구 AD6C	국 AD6D	군 AD70	굳 AD73	굴 AD74	굵 AD75	굶 AD76	굻 AD7B	굼 AD7C	굽 AD7D	굿 AD7F	궁 AD81	궂 AD82
307x/B0Fx	규 ADDC	균 ADE0	귤 ADE4	그 ADF8	극 ADF9	근 ADFC	글 AE00	긁 AE01	긇 AE07	금 AE08	급 AE09	긋 AE0B	긍 AE0D	기 AE30	긴 AE34	
312x/B1Ax		긷 AE37	길 AE38	긺 AE3A	김 AE40	깁 AE41	깃 AE43	깅 AE45	깇 AE47	깉 AE49	깊 AE4A	개 AC1C	객 AC1D	갠 AC20	갤 AC24	갬 AC2C
313x/B1Bx	갭 AC2D	갯 AC2F	갱 AC31	걔 AC54	걘 AC58	걜 AC5C	게 AC8C	겐 AC90	겔 AC94	겝 AC9D	겟 AC9F	겡 ACA1	겠 ACA0	계 ACC4	괴 AD34	괵 AD35
314x/B1Cx	괸 AD38	괼 AD3C	굄 AD44	굅 AD45	굉 AD49	굈 AD48	귀 ADC0	귄 ADC4	귈 ADC8	귐 ADD0	귑 ADD1	귓 ADD3	긔 AE14	과 ACFC	곽 ACFD	관 AD00
315x/B1Dx	괄 AD04	괆 AD06	괌 AD0C	괍 AD0D	광 AD11	괐 AD10	궈 AD88	권 AD8C	궐 AD90	궜 AD9C	괘 AD18	괜 AD1C	괠 AD20	괭 AD2D	궤 ADA4	ㄴ 3134
316x/B1Ex	ㄵ 3135	ㄶ 3136	나 B098	낙 B099	낛 B09B	난 B09C	낟 B09F	날 B0A0	낡 B0A1	낢 B0A2	남 B0A8	납 B0A9	낫 B0AB	낭 B0AD	낮 B0AE	낯 B0AF
317x/B1Fx	낱 B0B1	낳 B0B3	낚 B09A	났 B0AC	냐 B0D0	냘 B0D8	냠 B0E0	냥 B0E5	너 B108	넉 B109	넋 B10B	넌 B10C	널 B110	넒 B112	넓 B113	
322x/B2Ax		넘 B118	넙 B119	넛 B11B	넝 B11D	넣 B123	넜 B11C	녀 B140	녁 B141	년 B144	녈 B148	념 B150	녑 B151	녕 B155	녘 B158	녔 B154
323x/B2Bx	노 B178	녹 B179	논 B17C	놀 B180	놂 B182	놈 B188	놉 B189	놋 B18B	농 B18D	높 B192	놓 B193	뇨 B1E8	뇽 B1FD	누 B204	눅 B205	눈 B208
324x/B2Cx	눋 B20B	눌 B20C	눔 B214	눕 B215	눙 B219	눞 B21E	뉴 B274	뉵 B275	늄 B284	늉 B289	느 B290	늑 B291	는 B294	늘 B298	늙 B299	늚 B29A
325x/B2Dx	늠 B2A0	늡 B2A1	능 B2A5	늦 B2A6	늧 B2A7	늪 B2AA	니 B2C8	닉 B2C9	닌 B2CC	닐 B2D0	님 B2D8	닙 B2D9	닝 B2DD	내 B0B4	낸 B0B8	낼 B0BC
326x/B2Ex	냄 B0C4	냅 B0C5	냇 B0C7	냉 B0C9	냈 B0C8	네 B124	넥 B125	넨 B128	넬 B12C	넵 B135	넷 B137	넹 B139	녜 B15C	뇌 B1CC	뇝 B1DD	뉘 B258
327x/B2Fx	뉜 B25C	뉠 B260	뉨 B268	뉩 B269	늬 B2AC	늴 B2B4	닁 B2C1	놔 B194	놨 B1A8	눠 B220	눴 B234	놰 B1B0	눼 B23C	ㄷ 3137	다 B2E4	
332x/B3Ax		닥 B2E5	단 B2E8	닫 B2EB	달 B2EC	닭 B2ED	닮 B2EE	닲 B2F2	닳 B2F3	담 B2F4	답 B2F5	닷 B2F7	당 B2F9	닺 B2FA	닻 B2FB	닿 B2FF
333x/B3Bx	닦 B2E6	닸 B2F8	댜 B31C	더 B354	덕 B355	던 B358	덜 B35C	덞 B35E	덟 B35F	덤 B364	덥 B365	덧 B367	덩 B369	덫 B36B	덮 B36E	덖 B356
334x/B3Cx	덨 B368	뎌 B38C	뎠 B3A0	도 B3C4	독 B3C5	돈 B3C8	돋 B3CB	돌 B3CC	돎 B3CE	돐 B3D0	돔 B3D4	돕 B3D5	돗 B3D7	동 B3D9	돛 B3DB	됴 B434
335x/B3Dx	두 B450	둑 B451	둔 B454	둘 B458	둠 B460	둡 B461	둥 B465	듀 B4C0	듈 B4C8	듐 B4D0	드 B4DC	득 B4DD	든 B4E0	듣 B4E3	들 B4E4	듦 B4E6
336x/B3Ex	듬 B4EC	듭 B4ED	듯 B4EF	등 B4F1	디 B514	딘 B518	딛 B51B	딜 B51C	딤 B524	딥 B525	딩 B529	딪 B52A	대 B300	댁 B301	댄 B304	댈 B308
337x/B3Fx	댐 B310	댑 B311	댓 B313	댕 B315	댔 B314	데 B370	덱 B371	덴 B374	델 B378	뎀 B380	뎁 B381	뎅 B385	뎄 B384	뎨 B3A8	되 B418	
342x/B4Ax		된 B41C	될 B420	됨 B428	됩 B429	뒤 B4A4	뒨 B4A8	뒴 B4B4	뒵 B4B5	뒷 B4B7	뒹 B4B9	돠 B3E0	돨 B3E8	둬 B46C	둴 B474	둼 B47C
343x/B4Bx	둿 B47F	뒀 B480	돼 B3FC	됐 B410	뒈 B488	뒝 B49D	뒜 B49C	ㄹ 3139	ㄺ 313A	ㄻ 313B	ㄼ 313C	ㄽ 313D	ㄾ 313E	ㄿ 313F	ㅀ 3140	라 B77C
344x/B4Cx	락 B77D	란 B780	랄 B784	람 B78C	랍 B78D	랏 B78F	랑 B791	랗 B797	랐 B790	랴 B7B4	략 B7B5	량 B7C9	러 B7EC	럭 B7ED	런 B7F0	럴 B7F4
345x/B4Dx	럼 B7FC	럽 B7FD	럿 B7FF	렁 B801	렇 B807	렀 B800	려 B824	력 B825	련 B828	렬 B82C	렴 B834	렵 B835	렷 B837	령 B839	렸 B838	로 B85C
346x/B4Ex	록 B85D	론 B860	롤 B864	롬 B86C	롭 B86D	롯 B86F	롱 B871	료 B8CC	룡 B8E1	루 B8E8	룩 B8E9	룬 B8EC	룰 B8F0	룸 B8F8	룹 B8F9	룻 B8FB
347x/B4Fx	룽 B8FD	류 B958	륙 B959	륜 B95C	률 B960	륨 B968	륭 B96D	르 B974	륵 B975	른 B978	를 B97C	름 B984	릅 B985	릇 B987	릉 B989	
352x/B5Ax		릊 B98A	릎 B98E	리 B9AC	릭 B9AD	린 B9B0	릴 B9B4	림 B9BC	립 B9BD	릿 B9BF	링 B9C1	래 B798	랜 B79C	랠 B7A0	램 B7A8	랩 B7A9
353x/B5Bx	랫 B7AB	랭 B7AD	랬 B7AC	레 B808	렉 B809	렌 B80C	렘 B818	렙 B819	렛 B81B	렝 B81D	례 B840	뢰 B8B0	뢴 B8B4	뢸 B8B8	룁 B8C1	뤼 B93C
354x/B5Cx	릐 B990	롸 B878	뤄 B904	뤘 B918	ㅁ 3141	마 B9C8	막 B9C9	만 B9CC	많 B9CE	맏 B9CF	말 B9D0	맑 B9D1	맒 B9D2	맘 B9D8	맙 B9D9	맛 B9DB
355x/B5Dx	망 B9DD	맞 B9DE	맡 B9E1	맣 B9E3	먀 BA00	먈 BA08	머 BA38	먹 BA39	먼 BA3C	멀 BA40	멂 BA42	멈 BA48	멉 BA49	멋 BA4B	멍 BA4D	멎 BA4E
356x/B5Ex	멓 BA53	며 BA70	멱 BA71	면 BA74	멸 BA78	몃 BA83	명 BA85	몇 BA87	몄 BA84	모 BAA8	목 BAA9	몫 BAAB	몬 BAAC	몰 BAB0	몲 BAB2	몸 BAB8
357x/B5Fx	몹 BAB9	못 BABB	몽 BABD	묘 BB18	무 BB34	묵 BB35	문 BB38	묻 BB3B	물 BB3C	묽 BB3D	묾 BB3E	뭄 BB44	뭅 BB45	뭇 BB47	뭉 BB49	
362x/B6Ax		뭍 BB4D	뭏 BB4F	묶 BB36	뮤 BBA4	뮨 BBA8	뮬 BBAC	뮴 BBB4	므 BBC0	믐 BBD0	미 BBF8	믹 BBF9	민 BBFC	믿 BBFF	밀 BC00	밂 BC02
363x/B6Bx	밈 BC08	밉 BC09	밋 BC0B	밍 BC0D	및 BC0F	밑 BC11	매 B9E4	맥 B9E5	맨 B9E8	맬 B9EC	맴 B9F4	맵 B9F5	맷 B9F7	맹 B9F9	맺 B9FA	맸 B9F8
364x/B6Cx	메 BA54	멕 BA55	멘 BA58	멜 BA5C	멤 BA64	멥 BA65	멧 BA67	멨 BA68	뫼 BAFC	묏 BB0F	뮈 BB88	믜 BBDC	뫄 BAC4	뭐 BB50	뭔 BB54	뭘 BB58
365x/B6Dx	뭡 BB61	뭣 BB63	뭬 BB6C	뭰 BB70	뭴 BB74	뭽 BB7D	ㅂ 3142	ㅄ 3144	바 BC14	박 BC15	반 BC18	받 BC1B	발 BC1C	밝 BC1D	밞 BC1E	밟 BC1F
366x/B6Ex	밤 BC24	밥 BC25	밧 BC27	방 BC29	밭 BC2D	밖 BC16	뱌 BC4C	뱍 BC4D	뱐 BC50	뱝 BC5D	버 BC84	벅 BC85	번 BC88	벋 BC8B	벌 BC8C	벎 BC8E
367x/B6Fx	범 BC94	법 BC95	벗 BC97	벙 BC99	벼 BCBC	벽 BCBD	변 BCC0	별 BCC4	볌 BCCC	볍 BCCD	볏 BCCF	병 BCD1	볕 BCD5	볐 BCD0	보 BCF4	
372x/B7Ax		복 BCF5	본 BCF8	볼 BCFC	봄 BD04	봅 BD05	봇 BD07	봉 BD09	봏 BD0F	볶 BCF6	뵤 BD64	부 BD80	북 BD81	분 BD84	붇 BD87	불 BD88
373x/B7Bx	붉 BD89	붊 BD8A	붐 BD90	붑 BD91	붓 BD93	붕 BD95	붙 BD99	붚 BD9A	뷰 BDF0	뷸 BDF8	븀 BE00	브 BE0C	븐 BE10	블 BE14	비 BE44	빅 BE45
374x/B7Cx	빈 BE48	빌 BE4C	빎 BE4E	빔 BE54	빕 BE55	빗 BE57	빙 BE59	빚 BE5A	빛 BE5B	배 BC30	백 BC31	밴 BC34	밸 BC38	뱀 BC40	뱁 BC41	뱃 BC43
375x/B7Dx	뱅 BC45	뱉 BC49	뱄 BC44	베 BCA0	벡 BCA1	벤 BCA4	벨 BCA8	벰 BCB0	벱 BCB1	벵 BCB5	벴 BCB4	볘 BCD8	뵈 BD48	뵌 BD4C	뵐 BD50	뵘 BD58
376x/B7Ex	뵙 BD59	뵜 BD5C	뷔 BDD4	븨 BE28	봐 BD10	봣 BD23	봤 BD24	붜 BD9C	붴 BDB4	붰 BDB0	ㅅ 3145	사 C0AC	삭 C0AD	삯 C0AF	산 C0B0	살 C0B4
377x/B7Fx	삵 C0B5	삶 C0B6	삼 C0BC	삽 C0BD	삿 C0BF	상 C0C1	샅 C0C5	샀 C0C0	샤 C0E4	샨 C0E8	샬 C0EC	샴 C0F4	샷 C0F7	샹 C0F9	서 C11C	
382x/B8Ax		석 C11D	섟 C11F	선 C120	섣 C123	설 C124	섦 C126	섧 C127	섬 C12C	섭 C12D	섯 C12F	성 C131	섶 C136	섞 C11E	섰 C130	셔 C154
383x/B8Bx	션 C158	셨 C168	소 C18C	속 C18D	손 C190	솔 C194	솖 C196	솜 C19C	솝 C19D	솟 C19F	송 C1A1	솥 C1A5	솎 C18E	쇼 C1FC	쇽 C1FD	숀 C200
384x/B8Cx	숄 C204	숍 C20D	수 C218	숙 C219	순 C21C	숟 C21F	술 C220	숨 C228	숩 C229	숫 C22B	숭 C22D	숯 C22F	숱 C231	숲 C232	슈 C288	슉 C289
385x/B8Dx	슌 C28C	슐 C290	슘 C298	슛 C29B	스 C2A4	슥 C2A5	슨 C2A8	슬 C2AC	슭 C2AD	슴 C2B4	습 C2B5	슷 C2B7	승 C2B9	시 C2DC	식 C2DD	신 C2E0
386x/B8Ex	싣 C2E3	실 C2E4	싫 C2EB	심 C2EC	십 C2ED	싯 C2EF	싱 C2F1	싳 C2F3	싶 C2F6	새 C0C8	색 C0C9	샌 C0CC	샐 C0D0	샘 C0D8	샙 C0D9	샛 C0DB
387x/B8Fx	생 C0DD	샜 C0DC	세 C138	섹 C139	센 C13C	셀 C140	셈 C148	셉 C149	셋 C14B	셍 C14D	셌 C14C	쇠 C1E0	쇤 C1E4	쇨 C1E8	쇰 C1F0	
392x/B9Ax		쇱 C1F1	쇳 C1F3	쇴 C1F4	쉬 C26C	쉰 C270	쉴 C274	쉼 C27C	쉽 C27D	쉿 C27F	싀 C2C0	솨 C1A8	솰 C1B0	숴 C234	쉈 C248	쇄 C1C4
393x/B9Bx	쇘 C1D8	쉐 C250	쉑 C251	쉘 C258	ㅈ 3148	자 C790	작 C791	잔 C794	잖 C796	잗 C797	잘 C798	잚 C79A	잠 C7A0	잡 C7A1	잣 C7A3	장 C7A5
394x/B9Cx	잦 C7A6	잤 C7A4	쟈 C7C8	쟉 C7C9	쟌 C7CC	쟐 C7D0	쟝 C7DD	저 C800	적 C801	전 C804	젆 C806	절 C808	젊 C80A	점 C810	접 C811	젓 C813
395x/B9Dx	정 C815	젖 C816	젔 C814	져 C838	젼 C83C	졋 C84B	졌 C84C	조 C870	족 C871	존 C874	졸 C878	졺 C87A	좀 C880	좁 C881	좃 C883	종 C885
396x/B9Ex	좆 C886	좇 C887	좋 C88B	죠 C8E0	죤 C8E4	주 C8FC	죽 C8FD	준 C900	줄 C904	줆 C906	줌 C90C	줍 C90D	줏 C90F	중 C911	쥬 C96C	쥴 C974
397x/B9Fx	쥼 C97C	즈 C988	즉 C989	즐 C990	즘 C998	즙 C999	증 C99D	지 C9C0	직 C9C1	진 C9C4	질 C9C8	짊 C9CA	짐 C9D0	집 C9D1	짓 C9D3	
3A2x/BAAx		징 C9D5	짖 C9D6	짙 C9D9	짚 C9DA	재 C7AC	잰 C7B0	잴 C7B4	잼 C7BC	잽 C7BD	잿 C7BF	쟁 C7C1	쟀 C7C0	쟤 C7E4	제 C81C	젝 C81D
3A3x/BABx	젠 C820	젤 C824	젬 C82C	젱 C831	젰 C830	죄 C8C4	죈 C8C8	죌 C8CC	죔 C8D4	죕 C8D5	죘 C8D8	쥐 C950	쥔 C954	쥘 C958	쥠 C960	쥡 C961
3A4x/BACx	좌 C88C	좍 C88D	좐 C890	좔 C894	줘 C918	줬 C92C	좨 C8A8	좽 C8BD	좼 C8BC	줴 C934	쥈 C948	ㅊ 314A	차 CC28	착 CC29	찬 CC2C	찮 CC2E
3A5x/BADx	찰 CC30	참 CC38	찹 CC39	찻 CC3B	창 CC3D	찾 CC3E	찼 CC3C	챠 CC60	챤 CC64	챨 CC68	챰 CC70	처 CC98	척 CC99	천 CC9C	철 CCA0	첨 CCA8
3A6x/BAEx	첩 CCA9	첫 CCAB	청 CCAD	쳐 CCD0	쳤 CCE4	초 CD08	촉 CD09	촌 CD0C	촐 CD10	촘 CD18	촙 CD19	촛 CD1B	총 CD1D	쵸 CD78	추 CD94	축 CD95
3A7x/BAFx	춘 CD98	출 CD9C	춤 CDA4	춥 CDA5	춧 CDA7	충 CDA9	츄 CE04	츔 CE14	츠 CE20	측 CE21	츰 CE30	층 CE35	치 CE58	칙 CE59	친 CE5C	
3B2x/BBAx		칠 CE60	칡 CE61	침 CE68	칩 CE69	칫 CE6B	칭 CE6D	채 CC44	책 CC45	챈 CC48	챌 CC4C	챔 CC54	챕 CC55	챗 CC57	챙 CC59	챘 CC58
3B3x/BBBx	체 CCB4	첸 CCB8	첼 CCBC	쳇 CCC7	쳉 CCC9	최 CD5C	취 CDE8	촬 CD2C	춰 CDB0	췄 CDC4	췌 CDCC	ㅋ 314B	카 CE74	칵 CE75	칸 CE78	칼 CE7C
3B4x/BBCx	캄 CE84	캅 CE85	캉 CE89	캬 CEAC	캭 CEAD	컁 CEC1	커 CEE4	컥 CEE5	컨 CEE8	컫 CEEB	컬 CEEC	컴 CEF4	컵 CEF5	컷 CEF7	컹 CEF9	컽 CEFD
3B5x/BBDx	컸 CEF8	켜 CF1C	켠 CF20	켤 CF24	켬 CF2C	켭 CF2D	켰 CF30	코 CF54	콕 CF55	콘 CF58	콜 CF5C	콤 CF64	콥 CF65	콧 CF67	콩 CF69	쿄 CFC4
3B6x/BBEx	쿠 CFE0	쿡 CFE1	쿨 CFE8	쿰 CFF0	쿵 CFF5	큐 D050	크 D06C	큰 D070	클 D074	큼 D07C	큽 D07D	킁 D081	키 D0A4	킥 D0A5	킨 D0A8	킬 D0AC
3B7x/BBFx	킴 D0B4	킵 D0B5	킷 D0B7	킹 D0B9	캐 CE90	캑 CE91	캔 CE94	캘 CE98	캠 CEA0	캡 CEA1	캥 CEA5	캤 CEA4	케 CF00	켄 CF04	켈 CF08	
3C2x/BCAx		켓 CF13	켕 CF15	켸 CF38	쾨 CFA8	퀴 D034	퀵 D035	퀸 D038	킈 D088	콰 CF70	콱 CF71	콸 CF78	쾅 CF85	쿼 CFFC	퀄 D004	퀑 D011
3C3x/BCBx	쾌 CF8C	쾟 CF9F	퀘 D018	퀭 D02D	ㅌ 314C	타 D0C0	탁 D0C1	탄 D0C4	탈 D0C8	탉 D0C9	탐 D0D0	탑 D0D1	탓 D0D3	탕 D0D5	탔 D0D4	탸 D0F8
3C4x/BCCx	터 D130	턱 D131	턴 D134	털 D138	턺 D13A	텀 D140	텁 D141	텅 D145	텄 D144	텨 D168	텼 D17C	토 D1A0	톡 D1A1	톤 D1A4	톨 D1A8	톰 D1B0
3C5x/BCDx	톱 D1B1	톳 D1B3	통 D1B5	톺 D1BA	툐 D210	투 D22C	툭 D22D	툰 D230	툴 D234	툼 D23C	툽 D23D	퉁 D241	튜 D29C	튬 D2AC	트 D2B8	특 D2B9
3C6x/BCEx	튼 D2BC	튿 D2BF	틀 D2C0	틂 D2C2	틈 D2C8	틉 D2C9	틋 D2CB	티 D2F0	틱 D2F1	틴 D2F4	틸 D2F8	팀 D300	팁 D301	팅 D305	태 D0DC	택 D0DD
3C7x/BCFx	탠 D0E0	탤 D0E4	탬 D0EC	탭 D0ED	탯 D0EF	탱 D0F1	탰 D0F0	테 D14C	텍 D14D	텐 D150	텔 D154	템 D15C	텝 D15D	텡 D161	퇴 D1F4	
3D2x/BDAx		툇 D207	튀 D280	튄 D284	튈 D288	튐 D290	튑 D291	튕 D295	틔 D2D4	퇀 D1C0	퉈 D248	퉜 D25C	퉤 D264	퉸 D278	ㅍ 314D	파 D30C
3D3x/BDBx	팍 D30D	판 D310	팔 D314	팖 D316	팜 D31C	팝 D31D	팟 D31F	팡 D321	팥 D325	팎 D30E	팠 D320	퍄 D344	퍅 D345	퍼 D37C	퍽 D37D	펀 D380
3D4x/BDCx	펄 D384	펌 D38C	펑 D391	펐 D390	펴 D3B4	편 D3B8	펼 D3BC	폄 D3C4	폅 D3C5	평 D3C9	폈 D3C8	포 D3EC	폭 D3ED	폰 D3F0	폴 D3F4	폼 D3FC
3D5x/BDDx	퐁 D401	표 D45C	푱 D471	푸 D478	푹 D479	푼 D47C	풀 D480	풂 D482	품 D488	풉 D489	풋 D48B	풍 D48D	퓨 D4E8	프 D504	픈 D508	플 D50C
3D6x/BDEx	픔 D514	픕 D515	피 D53C	픽 D53D	핀 D540	필 D544	핌 D54C	핍 D54D	핏 D54F	핑 D551	패 D328	팩 D329	팬 D32C	팰 D330	팸 D338	팹 D339
3D7x/BDFx	팽 D33D	팼 D33C	페 D398	펙 D399	펜 D39C	펠 D3A0	펭 D3AD	폐 D3D0	ㅎ 314E	하 D558	학 D559	한 D55C	할 D560	핥 D565	함 D568	
3E2x/BEAx		합 D569	핫 D56B	항 D56D	햐 D590	향 D5A5	허 D5C8	헉 D5C9	헌 D5CC	헐 D5D0	헒 D5D2	험 D5D8	헙 D5D9	헛 D5DB	헝 D5DD	혀 D600
3E3x/BEBx	혁 D601	현 D604	혈 D608	혐 D610	협 D611	혓 D613	형 D615	혔 D614	호 D638	혹 D639	혼 D63C	홀 D640	홈 D648	홉 D649	홋 D64B	홍 D64D
3E4x/BECx	홑 D651	효 D6A8	후 D6C4	훅 D6C5	훈 D6C8	훌 D6CC	훑 D6D1	훔 D6D4	훗 D6D7	휴 D734	휼 D73C	흄 D744	흉 D749	흐 D750	흑 D751	흔 D754
3E5x/BEDx	흖 D756	흗 D757	흘 D758	흙 D759	흠 D760	흡 D761	흣 D763	흥 D765	흩 D769	히 D788	힌 D78C	힐 D790	힘 D798	힙 D799	힝 D79D	해 D574
3E6x/BEEx	핵 D575	핸 D578	핼 D57C	햄 D584	햅 D585	햇 D587	행 D589	했 D588	헤 D5E4	헥 D5E5	헨 D5E8	헬 D5EC	헴 D5F4	헵 D5F5	헷 D5F7	헹 D5F9
3E7x/BEFx	헸 D5F8	혜 D61C	회 D68C	획 D68D	횝 D69D	횟 D69F	횡 D6A1	휘 D718	휙 D719	휜 D71C	휠 D720	휨 D728	휩 D729	휭 D72D	희 D76C	
3F2x/BFAx		흰 D770	흴 D774	흼 D77C	흽 D77D	힁 D781	화 D654	확 D655	환 D658	활 D65C	홥 D665	홧 D667	황 D669	홨 D668	훠 D6E0	훤 D6E4
3F3x/BFBx	훨 D6E8	홰 D670	홱 D671	횃 D683	횅 D685	훼 D6FC	휀 D700	휑 D711	ㄲ 3132	까 AE4C	깍 AE4D	깐 AE50	깔 AE54	깖 AE56	깜 AE5C	깝 AE5D
3F4x/BFCx	깟 AE5F	깡 AE61	깢 AE62	깥 AE65	깎 AE4E	깠 AE60	꺄 AE84	꺼 AEBC	꺽 AEBD	껀 AEC0	껄 AEC4	껌 AECC	껍 AECD	껏 AECF	껑 AED1	꺾 AEBE
3F5x/BFDx	껐 AED0	껴 AEF4	꼈 AF08	꼬 AF2C	꼭 AF2D	꼰 AF30	꼲 AF32	꼴 AF34	꼼 AF3C	꼽 AF3D	꼿 AF3F	꽁 AF41	꽂 AF42	꽃 AF43	꾜 AF9C	꾸 AFB8
3F6x/BFEx	꾹 AFB9	꾼 AFBC	꿀 AFC0	꿇 AFC7	꿈 AFC8	꿉 AFC9	꿋 AFCB	꿍 AFCD	꿎 AFCE	뀨 B028	끄 B044	끅 B045	끈 B048	끊 B04A	끌 B04C	끎 B04E
3F7x/BFFx	끓 B053	끔 B054	끕 B055	끗 B057	끙 B059	끝 B05D	끼 B07C	끽 B07D	낀 B080	낄 B084	낌 B08C	낍 B08D	낑 B091	깨 AE68	깩 AE69	
402x/C0Ax		깬 AE6C	깰 AE70	깸 AE78	깹 AE79	깻 AE7B	깽 AE7D	깼 AE7C	께 AED8	껜 AEDC	껠 AEE0	껨 AEE8	꾀 AF80	꾄 AF84	꾈 AF88	꾐 AF90
403x/C0Bx	꾑 AF91	꾔 AF94	뀌 B00C	뀐 B010	뀔 B014	뀜 B01C	뀝 B01D	꽈 AF48	꽉 AF49	꽐 AF50	꽛 AF5B	꽝 AF5D	꽜 AF5C	꿔 AFD4	꿜 AFDC	꿩 AFE9
404x/C0Cx	꿨 AFE8	꽤 AF64	꽥 AF65	꽹 AF79	꿰 AFF0	꿱 AFF1	꿴 AFF4	꿸 AFF8	뀀 B000	뀁 B001	뀄 B004	ㄸ 3138	따 B530	딱 B531	딴 B534	딸 B538
405x/C0Dx	땀 B540	땁 B541	땃 B543	땅 B545	땋 B54B	땄 B544	떠 B5A0	떡 B5A1	떤 B5A4	떨 B5A8	떪 B5AA	떫 B5AB	떰 B5B0	떱 B5B1	떳 B5B3	떵 B5B5
406x/C0Ex	떻 B5BB	떴 B5B4	또 B610	똑 B611	똘 B618	똠 B620	똥 B625	뚜 B69C	뚝 B69D	뚠 B6A0	뚤 B6A4	뚫 B6AB	뚬 B6AC	뚭 B6AD	뚱 B6B1	뜌 B70C
407x/C0Fx	뜨 B728	뜩 B729	뜬 B72C	뜯 B72F	뜰 B730	뜸 B738	뜹 B739	뜻 B73B	띠 B760	띤 B764	띨 B768	띰 B770	띱 B771	띵 B775	때 B54C	
412x/C1Ax		땍 B54D	땐 B550	땔 B554	땜 B55C	땝 B55D	땡 B561	땠 B560	떼 B5BC	떽 B5BD	뗀 B5C0	뗄 B5C4	뗌 B5CC	뗍 B5CD	뗏 B5CF	뗑 B5D1
413x/C1Bx	뗐 B5D0	뙤 B664	뙹 B679	뛰 B6F0	뛴 B6F4	뛸 B6F8	뜀 B700	뜁 B701	띄 B744	띈 B748	띌 B74C	띔 B754	띕 B755	똬 B62C	똴 B634	뙈 B648
414x/C1Cx	ㅃ 3143	빠 BE60	빡 BE61	빤 BE64	빨 BE68	빪 BE6A	빱 BE71	빳 BE73	빵 BE75	빻 BE7B	빴 BE74	뺘 BE98	뺙 BE99	뺜 BE9C	뺨 BEA8	뻐 BED0
415x/C1Dx	뻑 BED1	뻔 BED4	뻗 BED7	뻘 BED8	뻣 BEE3	뻥 BEE5	뻤 BEE4	뼈 BF08	뼉 BF09	뼘 BF18	뼛 BF1B	뽀 BF40	뽄 BF44	뽈 BF48	뽐 BF50	뽑 BF51
416x/C1Ex	뽕 BF55	뽛 BF5B	뾰 BFB0	뿅 BFC5	뿌 BFCC	뿍 BFCD	뿐 BFD0	뿔 BFD4	뿜 BFDC	뿡 BFE1	쀼 C03C	쁘 C058	쁜 C05C	쁠 C060	쁨 C068	쁩 C069
417x/C1Fx	삐 C090	삑 C091	삔 C094	삘 C098	삠 C0A0	삡 C0A1	삥 C0A5	빼 BE7C	빽 BE7D	뺀 BE80	뺄 BE84	뺌 BE8C	뺍 BE8D	뺏 BE8F	뺑 BE91	
422x/C2Ax		뺐 BE90	뻬 BEEC	뻰 BEF0	뼁 BF01	ㅆ 3146	싸 C2F8	싹 C2F9	싼 C2FC	쌀 C300	쌈 C308	쌉 C309	쌍 C30D	쌓 C313	쌌 C30C	쌰 C330
423x/C2Bx	써 C368	썩 C369	썬 C36C	썰 C370	썲 C372	썸 C378	썹 C379	썻 C37B	썽 C37D	썼 C37C	쎠 C3A0	쏘 C3D8	쏙 C3D9	쏜 C3DC	쏟 C3DF	쏠 C3E0
424x/C2Cx	쏢 C3E2	쏨 C3E8	쏩 C3E9	쏭 C3ED	쑈 C448	쑐 C450	쑤 C464	쑥 C465	쑨 C468	쑬 C46C	쑴 C474	쑵 C475	쑹 C479	쓔 C4D4	쓰 C4F0	쓱 C4F1
425x/C2Dx	쓴 C4F4	쓸 C4F8	쓺 C4FA	쓿 C4FF	씀 C500	씁 C501	씨 C528	씩 C529	씬 C52C	씰 C530	씸 C538	씹 C539	씻 C53B	씽 C53D	쌔 C314	쌕 C315
426x/C2Ex	쌘 C318	쌜 C31C	쌤 C324	쌥 C325	쌩 C329	쎄 C384	쎅 C385	쎈 C388	쎌 C38C	쐬 C42C	쐭 C42D	쐰 C430	쐴 C434	쐼 C43C	쐽 C43D	쒸 C4B8
427x/C2Fx	씌 C50C	쏴 C3F4	쏼 C3FC	쐇 C407	쐈 C408	쒀 C480	쒔 C494	쐐 C410	쐑 C411	쒜 C49C	ㅉ 3149	짜 C9DC	짝 C9DD	짠 C9E0	짢 C9E2	
432x/C3Ax		짤 C9E4	짧 C9E7	짬 C9EC	짭 C9ED	짯 C9EF	짱 C9F1	짰 C9F0	쨔 CA14	쨤 CA24	쩌 CA4C	쩍 CA4D	쩐 CA50	쩔 CA54	쩜 CA5C	쩝 CA5D
433x/C3Bx	쩟 CA5F	쩡 CA61	쪄 CA84	쪘 CA98	쪼 CABC	쪽 CABD	쫀 CAC0	쫄 CAC4	쫌 CACC	쫍 CACD	쫏 CACF	쫑 CAD1	쫒 CAD2	쫓 CAD3	쬬 CB2C	쭈 CB48
434x/C3Cx	쭉 CB49	쭌 CB4C	쭐 CB50	쭘 CB58	쭙 CB59	쭝 CB5D	쮸 CBB8	쮼 CBBC	쯔 CBD4	쯘 CBD8	쯤 CBE4	쯧 CBE7	찌 CC0C	찍 CC0D	찐 CC10	찔 CC14
435x/C3Dx	찜 CC1C	찝 CC1D	찟 CC1F	찡 CC21	찢 CC22	찦 CC26	찧 CC27	째 C9F8	짹 C9F9	짼 C9FC	쨀 CA00	쨈 CA08	쨉 CA09	쨋 CA0B	쨍 CA0D	쨌 CA0C
436x/C3Ex	쩨 CA68	쩬 CA6C	쩰 CA70	쩽 CA7D	쬐 CB10	쬔 CB14	쬘 CB18	쬠 CB20	쬡 CB21	쬤 CB24	쫘 CAD8	쫙 CAD9	쫠 CAE0	쫭 CAED	쭤 CB64	ㅇ 3147
437x/C3Fx	ㅏ 314F	아 C544	악 C545	안 C548	앉 C549	않 C54A	알 C54C	앍 C54D	앎 C54E	앓 C553	암 C554	압 C555	앗 C557	앙 C559	앞 C55E	
442x/C4Ax		았 C558	ㅑ 3151	야 C57C	약 C57D	얀 C580	얄 C584	얇 C587	얌 C58C	얍 C58D	얏 C58F	양 C591	얕 C595	얗 C597	ㅓ 3153	어 C5B4
443x/C4Bx	억 C5B5	언 C5B8	얹 C5B9	얻 C5BB	얼 C5BC	얽 C5BD	얾 C5BE	엄 C5C4	업 C5C5	없 C5C6	엇 C5C7	엉 C5C9	엊 C5CA	엌 C5CC	엎 C5CE	엏 C5CF
444x/C4Cx	었 C5C8	ㅕ 3155	여 C5EC	역 C5ED	연 C5F0	엳 C5F3	열 C5F4	엶 C5F6	엷 C5F7	염 C5FC	엽 C5FD	엾 C5FE	엿 C5FF	영 C601	옅 C605	옆 C606
445x/C4Dx	옇 C607	엮 C5EE	였 C600	ㅗ 3157	오 C624	옥 C625	온 C628	올 C62C	옭 C62D	옮 C62E	옰 C630	옳 C633	옴 C634	옵 C635	옷 C637	옹 C639
446x/C4Ex	옻 C63B	ㅛ 315B	요 C694	욕 C695	욤 C6A4	용 C6A9	ㅜ 315C	우 C6B0	욱 C6B1	운 C6B4	울 C6B8	욺 C6BA	움 C6C0	웁 C6C1	웃 C6C3	웅 C6C5
447x/C4Fx	ㅠ 3160	유 C720	육 C721	윤 C724	율 C728	융 C735	윷 C737	ㅡ 3161	으 C73C	윽 C73D	은 C740	읃 C743	을 C744	읊 C74A	음 C74C	
452x/C5Ax		읍 C74D	읏 C74F	응 C751	읒 C752	읓 C753	읔 C754	읕 C755	읖 C756	읗 C757	ㅣ 3163	이 C774	익 C775	인 C778	일 C77C	읽 C77D
453x/C5Bx	잃 C783	임 C784	입 C785	잇 C787	잉 C789	잊 C78A	잎 C78E	있 C788	ㅐ 3150	애 C560	액 C561	앤 C564	앨 C568	앰 C570	앵 C575	ㅒ 3152
454x/C5Cx	얘 C598	얜 C59C	얠 C5A0	ㅔ 3154	에 C5D0	엑 C5D1	엔 C5D4	엘 C5D8	엠 C5E0	엣 C5E3	엥 C5E5	ㅖ 3156	예 C608	옌 C60C	옘 C618	옙 C619
455x/C5Dx	옛 C61B	옜 C61C	ㅚ 315A	외 C678	왼 C67C	욀 C680	욈 C688	욉 C689	욋 C68B	욍 C68D	ㅟ 315F	위 C704	윈 C708	윌 C70C	윔 C714	윗 C717
456x/C5Ex	윙 C719	ㅢ 3162	의 C758	ㅘ 3158	와 C640	왁 C641	완 C644	왈 C648	왓 C653	왕 C655	왔 C654	ㅝ 315D	워 C6CC	웍 C6CD	원 C6D0	월 C6D4
457x/C5Fx	웜 C6DC	웡 C6E1	웠 C6E0	ㅙ 3159	왜 C65C	왝 C65D	왱 C671	왰 C670	ㅞ 315E	웨 C6E8	웩 C6E9	웬 C6EC	웰 C6F0	웽 C6FD	윁 C701	
Hangul jamo (not syllable)

=== Level 2 (rows number 38 through 52) ===
GB 12052 (precomposed modern Hangul syllables, level 2)
	0	1	2	3	4	5	6	7	8	9	A	B	C	D	E	F
462x/C6Ax		갃 AC03	갋 AC0B	갌 AC0C	갹 AC39	갿 AC3F	걈 AC48	걋 AC4B	걍 AC4D	겇 AC87	겄 AC84	겱 ACB1	겴 ACB4	겾 ACBE	겿 ACBF	곩 ACE9
463x/C6Bx	곷 ACF7	굑 AD51	굗 AD57	굠 AD60	굣 AD63	굥 AD65	굸 AD78	귝 ADDD	귨 ADE8	귬 ADEC	귭 ADED	귱 ADF1	귾 ADFE	귿 ADFF	긂 AE02	긃 AE03
464x/C6Cx	긄 AE04	긏 AE0F	긑 AE11	긱 AE31	긹 AE39	긼 AE3C	깆 AE46	깋 AE4B	갢 AC22	갣 AC23	갰 AC30	걤 AC64	걥 AC65	겓 AC93	겜 AC9C	겥 ACA5
465x/C6Dx	곈 ACC8	곋 ACCB	곌 ACCC	곔 ACD4	곕 ACD5	곗 ACD7	곙 ACD9	괻 AD3B	굇 AD47	귁 ADC1	귇 ADC7	귕 ADD5	긘 AE18	긜 AE1C	긧 AE27	긩 AE29
466x/C6Ex	괃 AD03	괏 AD0F	궉 AD89	궏 AD8F	궝 AD9D	괙 AD19	괟 AD1F	괨 AD28	괩 AD29	괫 AD2B	괬 AD2C	궥 ADA5	궨 ADA8	궫 ADAB	궬 ADAC	궴 ADB4
467x/C6Fx	궵 ADB5	궷 ADB7	궹 ADB9	궸 ADB8	낤 B0A4	냑 B0D1	냔 B0D4	냗 B0D7	냡 B0E1	냩 B0E9	넏 B10F	넢 B122	녇 B147	녋 B14B	녓 B153	
472x/C7Ax		녙 B159	녚 B15A	녛 B15B	녾 B17E	녿 B17F	뇩 B1E9	뇬 B1EC	뇰 B1F0	뇸 B1F8	뇹 B1F9	눗 B217	뉸 B278	뉻 B27B	뉼 B27C	늅 B285
473x/C7Bx	늇 B287	늊 B28A	늗 B297	늜 B29C	늣 B2A3	늫 B2AB	닏 B2CF	닑 B2D1	닓 B2D3	닔 B2D4	닛 B2DB	닞 B2DE	닢 B2E2	닣 B2E3	낵 B0B5	낻 B0BB
474x/C7Cx	냬 B0EC	넁 B101	넫 B12B	넴 B134	녠 B160	녣 B163	녤 B164	녬 B16C	녭 B16D	녯 B16F	녱 B171	뇍 B1CD	뇐 B1D0	뇓 B1D3	뇔 B1D4	뇜 B1DC
475x/C7Dx	뇟 B1DF	뇡 B1E1	뇠 B1E0	뉟 B25F	뉫 B26B	늭 B2AD	늰 B2B0	늳 B2B3	늼 B2BC	늽 B2BD	늿 B2BF	놘 B198	놛 B19B	놜 B19C	놧 B1A7	놩 B1A9
476x/C7Ex	눤 B224	눧 B227	눨 B228	눳 B233	뉀 B240	뉃 B243	뉄 B244	뉌 B24C	뉍 B24D	뉐 B250	닯 B2EF	닰 B2F0	닶 B2F6	댝 B31D	댠 B320	댱 B331
477x/C7Fx	덛 B35B	덦 B366	뎍 B38D	뎐 B390	뎓 B393	뎔 B394	뎘 B398	뎜 B39C	뎝 B39D	뎟 B39F	뎡 B3A1	돇 B3C7	돏 B3CF	돝 B3DD	됵 B435	
482x/C8Ax		됸 B438	됻 B43B	둇 B447	둏 B44F	둗 B457	둙 B459	둛 B45B	둣 B463	둪 B46A	듁 B4C1	듄 B4C4	듓 B4D3	듕 B4D5	듥 B4E5	듧 B4E7
483x/C8Bx	듨 B4E8	딕 B515	딧 B527	딮 B52E	딯 B52F	댇 B307	덷 B377	뎃 B383	뎬 B3AC	뎻 B3BB	뎽 B3BD	됟 B41F	됫 B42B	됭 B42D	됬 B42C	뒫 B4AB
484x/C8Cx	뒬 B4AC	듸 B4F8	듼 B4FC	듿 B4FF	딀 B500	딉 B509	딋 B50B	딍 B50D	돡 B3E1	돤 B3E4	돵 B3F5	둰 B470	둳 B473	됀 B400	됃 B403	됄 B404
485x/C8Dx	됌 B40C	됍 B40D	됏 B40F	뒌 B48C	뒏 B48F	뒐 B490	뒘 B498	뒙 B499	뒛 B49B	랃 B783	랈 B788	랒 B792	랓 B793	랕 B795	랖 B796	랸 B7B8
486x/C8Ex	랼 B7BC	럄 B7C4	럅 B7C5	럳 B7F3	렂 B802	렆 B806	렫 B82B	렰 B830	렼 B83C	렾 B83E	롣 B863	롨 B868	롶 B876	룍 B8CD	룐 B8D0	룔 B8D4
487x/C8Fx	룜 B8DC	룝 B8DD	룯 B8EF	륟 B95F	륩 B969	륫 B96B	륻 B97B	릀 B980	릋 B98B	릍 B98D	릳 B9B3	맆 B9C6	랙 B799	랟 B79F	렏 B80F	
492x/C9Ax		렐 B810	렡 B821	롄 B844	롈 B848	롐 B850	롑 B851	롓 B853	롕 B855	뢱 B8B1	뢷 B8B7	룀 B8C0	룃 B8C3	룅 B8C5	룄 B8C4	뤽 B93D
493x/C9Bx	륀 B940	륄 B944	륌 B94C	륑 B951	릔 B994	릠 B9A0	릣 B9A3	롹 B879	롼 B87C	뢀 B880	뢍 B88D	뤈 B908	뤋 B90B	뤌 B90C	뢔 B894	뤠 B920
494x/C9Cx	뤤 B924	뤨 B928	뤰 B930	뤱 B931	뤳 B933	뤴 B934	맔 B9D4	맟 B9DF	먁 BA01	먄 BA04	먐 BA10	먕 BA15	먿 BA3F	멷 BA77	몀 BA80	몁 BA81
495x/C9Dx	몯 BAAF	몱 BAB1	몴 BAB4	묙 BB19	묜 BB1C	묠 BB20	묨 BB28	묩 BB29	묫 BB2B	묭 BB2D	뭀 BB40	뭋 BB4B	뮥 BBA5	뮵 BBB5	뮹 BBB9	믁 BBC1
496x/C9Ex	믃 BBC3	믄 BBC4	믇 BBC7	믈 BBC8	믌 BBCC	믑 BBD1	믓 BBD3	믕 BBD5	밄 BC04	맧 B9E7	맫 B9EB	먜 BA1C	멛 BA5B	멩 BA69	멫 BA6B	몌 BA8C
497x/C9Fx	몐 BA90	몓 BA93	몔 BA94	몟 BA9F	몡 BAA1	묀 BB00	묃 BB03	묄 BB04	묌 BB0C	묍 BB0D	묑 BB11	뮉 BB89	뮌 BB8C	뮐 BB90	뮙 BB99	
4A2x/CAAx		믝 BBDD	믠 BBE0	믤 BBE4	믭 BBED	믯 BBEF	믱 BBF1	믲 BBF2	뫈 BAC8	뫙 BAD9	뭗 BB57	뭠 BB60	뫠 BAE0	뭼 BB7C	뭿 BB7F	밗 BC17
4A3x/CABx	밠 BC20	밫 BC2B	밯 BC2F	뱔 BC54	뱜 BC5C	뱡 BC61	벚 BC9A	벜 BC9C	볃 BCC3	볈 BCC8	볓 BCD3	볔 BCD4	볷 BCF7	볻 BCFB	볿 BCFF	봊 BD0A
4A4x/CACx	봋 BD0B	뵬 BD6C	뵴 BD74	뵹 BD79	붋 BD8B	붗 BD97	뷴 BDF4	븍 BE0D	븓 BE13	븕 BE15	븗 BE17	븘 BE18	븜 BE1C	븝 BE1D	븟 BE1F	븥 BE25
4A5x/CADx	빋 BE4B	빝 BE5D	빟 BE5F	빘 BE58	밷 BC37	뱆 BC46	벧 BCA7	벳 BCB3	벸 BCB8	벹 BCB9	볜 BCDC	볭 BCED	뵏 BD4F	뵛 BD5B	뷕 BDD5	뷘 BDD8
4A6x/CAEx	뷛 BDDB	뷜 BDDC	뷤 BDE4	뷧 BDE7	뷩 BDE9	븩 BE29	븬 BE2C	븰 BE30	븻 BE3B	봔 BD14	봗 BD17	봥 BD25	붝 BD9D	붠 BDA0	붣 BDA3	붤 BDA4
4A7x/CAFx	붬 BDAC	붯 BDAF	봬 BD2C	봳 BD33	뵀 BD40	붸 BDB8	붼 BDBC	붿 BDBF	뷀 BDC0	뷈 BDC8	뷉 BDC9	뷌 BDCC	삳 C0B3	삷 C0B7	삸 C0B8	
4B2x/CBAx		샂 C0C2	샄 C0C4	샇 C0C7	샥 C0E5	샫 C0EB	샵 C0F5	섥 C125	섨 C128	셕 C155	셗 C157	셛 C15B	셜 C15C	셟 C15F	셤 C164	셥 C165
4B3x/CBBx	셧 C167	셩 C169	솓 C193	솕 C195	솗 C197	솘 C198	숃 C203	숌 C20C	숏 C20F	숑 C211	숤 C224	슏 C28F	슝 C29D	슫 C2AB	슯 C2AF	슰 C2B0
4B4x/CBCx	슲 C2B2	슳 C2B3	슺 C2BA	슻 C2BB	슾 C2BE	싥 C2E5	싨 C2E8	싞 C2DE	샋 C0CB	샏 C0CF	섀 C100	섐 C110	섕 C115	섿 C13F	셎 C14E	셰 C170
4B5x/CBDx	셴 C174	셸 C178	솀 C180	솃 C183	솅 C185	쇡 C1E1	쇧 C1E7	쇵 C1F5	쉭 C26D	쉳 C273	슁 C281	싁 C2C1	싄 C2C4	싈 C2C8	싓 C2D3	솩 C1A9
4B6x/CBEx	솬 C1AC	솽 C1BD	숸 C238	숻 C23B	쇅 C1C5	쇋 C1CB	쇗 C1D7	쇙 C1D9	쉔 C254	쉗 C257	쉠 C260	쉡 C261	쉣 C263	쉥 C265	쉤 C264	잓 C793
4B7x/CBFx	잙 C799	잩 C7A9	쟏 C7CF	쟘 C7D8	쟙 C7D9	쟛 C7DB	젇 C807	젉 C809	젙 C819	젛 C81B	젂 C802	젹 C839	젿 C83F	졀 C840	졁 C841	
4C2x/CCAx		졂 C842	졃 C843	졈 C848	졉 C849	졍 C84D	졎 C84E	졑 C851	졓 C853	졷 C877	죡 C8E1	죨 C8E8	죰 C8F0	죵 C8F5	죻 C8FB	줃 C903
4C3x/CCBx	줅 C905	줈 C908	줗 C917	쥭 C96D	쥰 C970	즁 C981	즌 C98C	즏 C98F	즑 C991	즒 C992	즔 C994	즛 C99B	즞 C99E	짇 C9C7	짒 C9D2	짗 C9D7
4C4x/CCCx	짛 C9DB	잭 C7AD	잲 C7B2	잳 C7B3	쟂 C7C2	쟨 C7E8	쟬 C7EC	쟴 C7F4	쟵 C7F5	젣 C823	젭 C82D	젯 C82F	젲 C832	졔 C854	졘 C858	졧 C867
4C5x/CCDx	졩 C869	죋 C8CB	죗 C8D7	죙 C8D9	쥑 C951	쥥 C965	즤 C9A4	즥 C9A5	즬 C9AC	즷 C9B7	즹 C9B9	좒 C892	좓 C893	좕 C895	좜 C89C	좝 C89D
4C6x/CCEx	좟 C89F	좡 C8A1	줟 C91F	줠 C920	줫 C92B	좩 C8A9	좯 C8AF	좻 C8BB	줸 C938	줻 C93B	줼 C93C	쥄 C944	쥅 C945	쥇 C947	쥉 C949	찯 CC2F
4C7x/CCFx	찱 CC31	챡 CC61	챱 CC71	챵 CC75	첟 CC9F	첬 CCAC	쳑 CCD1	쳔 CCD4	쳗 CCD7	쳘 CCD8	쳠 CCE0	쳡 CCE1	쳣 CCE3	쳥 CCE5	촏 CD0F	
4D2x/CDAx		쵹 CD79	쵼 CD7C	춀 CD80	춈 CD88	춋 CD8B	춍 CD8D	춛 CD9B	츅 CE05	츈 CE08	츌 CE0C	츙 CE19	츤 CE24	츧 CE27	츨 CE28	츩 CE29
4D3x/CDBx	츬 CE2C	츱 CE31	츳 CE33	칟 CE5F	칮 CE6E	챋 CC4B	첵 CCB5	첻 CCBB	쳄 CCC4	쳅 CCC5	쳈 CCC8	쳬 CCEC	쳰 CCF0	쳿 CCFF	촁 CD01	쵠 CD60
4D4x/CDCx	쵣 CD63	쵤 CD64	쵱 CD71	쵰 CD70	췬 CDEC	췯 CDEF	췰 CDF0	췸 CDF8	췹 CDF9	췻 CDFB	췽 CDFD	츼 CE3C	츽 CE3D	칀 CE40	칄 CE44	칏 CE4F
4D5x/CDDx	칑 CE51	촤 CD24	촨 CD28	촹 CD39	춷 CDB7	쵀 CD40	췡 CDE1	췠 CDE0	칻 CE7B	캇 CE87	캍 CE8D	캰 CEB0	켝 CF1D	켣 CF23	켯 CF2F	켱 CF31
4D6x/CDEx	콛 CF5B	콪 CF6A	쿔 CFD4	쿤 CFE4	쿱 CFF1	큔 D054	큘 D058	큥 D065	큭 D06D	킫 D0AB	캗 CE97	캣 CEA3	켁 CF01	켇 CF07	켐 CF10	켑 CF11
4D7x/CDFx	켙 CF19	콍 CF4D	쾬 CFAC	쾰 CFB0	쾸 CFB8	쾹 CFB9	쾽 CFBD	퀻 D03B	퀼 D03C	큄 D044	큇 D047	큉 D049	킌 D08C	킐 D090	킝 D09D	
4E2x/CEAx		콴 CF74	쾀 CF80	쾁 CF81	퀀 D000	쾓 CF93	쾡 CFA1	퀙 D019	퀜 D01C	퀠 D020	퀨 D028	퀩 D029	탇 D0C7	탊 D0CA	탏 D0CF	탹 D0F9
4E3x/CEBx	탼 D0FC	턍 D10D	턷 D137	턻 D13B	텃 D143	텩 D169	텬 D16C	텯 D16F	텰 D170	텸 D178	텹 D179	텻 D17B	텽 D17D	톧 D1A7	톷 D1B7	톹 D1B9
4E4x/CECx	툑 D211	툔 D214	툠 D220	툣 D223	툥 D225	툳 D233	툿 D23F	튝 D29D	튠 D2A0	튤 D2A4	튱 D2B1	틄 D2C4	틍 D2CD	틷 D2F7	팃 D303	탣 D0E3
4E5x/CEDx	텓 D153	텟 D15F	텦 D166	톄 D184	톈 D188	톗 D197	톙 D199	퇵 D1F5	퇸 D1F8	퇻 D1FB	퇼 D1FC	툄 D204	툅 D205	툉 D209	튁 D281	튇 D287
4E6x/CEEx	튓 D293	틘 D2D8	틜 D2DC	틤 D2E4	틥 D2E5	틧 D2E7	톼 D1BC	톽 D1BD	퇑 D1D1	퉏 D24F	퉝 D25D	퇘 D1D8	퉨 D268	퉫 D26B	퉬 D26C	퉴 D274
4E7x/CEFx	퉵 D275	팓 D313	팣 D323	퍈 D348	퍙 D359	펃 D383	펍 D38D	펏 D38F	펕 D395	펵 D3B5	펹 D3B9	펻 D3BB	폇 D3C7	폳 D3F3	폽 D3FD	
4F2x/CFAx		폿 D3FF	퐅 D405	푠 D460	푣 D463	푤 D464	푬 D46C	푭 D46D	푯 D46F	푿 D47F	퓰 D4F0	퓸 D4F8	픋 D50B	픐 D510	픗 D517	픙 D519
4F3x/CFBx	핃 D543	팯 D32F	팻 D33B	펟 D39F	펨 D3A8	펩 D3A9	펫 D3AB	펬 D3AC	폔 D3D4	폗 D3D7	폘 D3D8	폠 D3E0	폡 D3E1	폣 D3E3	폥 D3E5	푀 D440
4F4x/CFCx	푄 D444	푈 D448	푐 D450	푑 D451	퓌 D4CC	퓐 D4D0	퓔 D4D4	퓜 D4DC	퓡 D4E1	픠 D520	픤 D524	픨 D528	픳 D533	퐈 D408	퐌 D40C	퐐 D410
4F5x/CFDx	퐘 D418	퐙 D419	퐝 D41D	풔 D494	풘 D498	풰 D4B0	풴 D4B4	풸 D4B8	퓀 D4C0	퓁 D4C1	핟 D55F	핡 D561	핧 D567	햑 D591	헏 D5CF	헑 D5D1
4F6x/CFEx	헗 D5D7	헡 D5E1	헢 D5E2	혇 D607	혻 D63B	혿 D63F	홅 D645	횩 D6A9	횬 D6AC	횰 D6B0	횸 D6B8	횹 D6B9	훋 D6CB	훍 D6CD	훎 D6CE	훕 D6D5
4F7x/CFFx	훙 D6D9	휵 D735	휸 D738	흅 D745	힉 D789	힏 D78F	힗 D797	힛 D79B	핻 D57B	헫 D5EB	헾 D5FE	혠 D620	혤 D624	혬 D62C	혭 D62D	
502x/D0Ax		혯 D62F	혱 D631	횐 D690	횓 D693	횔 D694	횜 D69C	휟 D71F	휫 D72B	흳 D773	흿 D77F	홛 D65B	홠 D660	홤 D664	훡 D6E1	훳 D6F3
503x/D0Bx	훵 D6F5	홴 D674	홷 D677	홸 D678	횀 D680	횁 D681	훽 D6FD	휃 D703	휄 D704	휌 D70C	휍 D70D	휏 D70F	휐 D710	깓 AE53	꺅 AE85	꺌 AE8C
504x/D0Cx	꺙 AE99	껂 AEC2	껃 AEC3	껕 AED5	껵 AEF5	껸 AEF8	껻 AEFB	껼 AEFC	꼄 AF04	꼅 AF05	꼇 AF07	꼉 AF09	꼍 AF0D	꼳 AF33	꼸 AF38	꽅 AF45
505x/D0Dx	꾠 AFA0	꾣 AFA3	꾤 AFA4	꾬 AFAC	꾭 AFAD	꾿 AFBF	꿁 AFC1	뀬 B02C	뀰 B030	뀸 B038	뀹 B039	끋 B04B	끍 B04D	끛 B05B	낃 B083	낏 B08F
506x/D0Ex	낕 B095	깯 AE6F	꺠 AEA0	껙 AED9	껟 AEDF	껩 AEE9	껫 AEEB	껭 AEED	껬 AEEC	꼐 AF10	꼥 AF25	꾇 AF87	꾓 AF93	꾕 AF95	뀡 B021	끠 B060
507x/D0Fx	끡 B061	끧 B067	끳 B073	끵 B075	꽌 AF4C	꽏 AF4F	꽘 AF58	꽙 AF59	꿕 AFD5	꿘 AFD8	꿛 AFDB	꿧 AFE7	꽨 AF68	꽬 AF6C	꿷 AFF7	
512x/D1Ax		뀃 B003	뀅 B005	딷 B537	딻 B53B	딿 B53F	딲 B532	땩 B569	땬 B56C	땽 B57D	떧 B5A7	뗙 B5D9	뗜 B5DC	뗨 B5E8	뗩 B5E9	뗭 B5ED
513x/D1Bx	똔 B614	똗 B617	똡 B621	똣 B623	뚁 B681	뚣 B6A3	뚦 B6A6	뚧 B6A7	뚯 B6AF	뚵 B6B5	뜍 B70D	뜔 B714	뜡 B721	뜽 B73D	띡 B761	띧 B767
514x/D1Cx	띳 B773	띻 B77B	땓 B553	땟 B55F	뗃 B5C3	뗸 B5F8	똉 B609	뙨 B668	뙫 B66B	뙬 B66C	뙴 B674	뙵 B675	뙷 B677	뙸 B678	뛷 B6F7	뜃 B703
515x/D1Dx	뜅 B705	띙 B759	똭 B62D	똰 B630	뙁 B641	뚼 B6BC	뙉 B649	뙌 B64C	뙏 B64F	뙐 B650	뙘 B658	뙙 B659	뙜 B65C	뛔 B6D4	뛘 B6D8	뛛 B6DB
516x/D1Ex	뛜 B6DC	뛤 B6E4	뛥 B6E5	뛩 B6E9	뛨 B6E8	빧 BE67	빰 BE70	빹 BE79	뻠 BEE0	뻡 BEE1	뼌 BF0C	뼏 BF0F	뼐 BF10	뼙 BF19	뼝 BF1D	뼟 BF1F
517x/D1Fx	뼡 BF21	뼜 BF1C	뽁 BF41	뽙 BF59	뿀 BFC0	뿁 BFC1	뿓 BFD3	뿕 BFD5	뿝 BFDD	뿟 BFDF	뿥 BFE5	쁄 C044	쁟 C05F	쁫 C06B	삗 C097	
522x/D2Ax		삣 C0A3	삦 C0A6	삧 C0A7	삫 C0AB	뺃 BE83	뻭 BEED	뻳 BEF3	뻴 BEF4	뻼 BEFC	뻽 BEFD	뻿 BEFF	뼹 BF39	뾔 BF94	쀠 C020	쁴 C074
523x/D2Bx	뽜 BF5C	뽠 BF60	쀄 C004	싻 C2FB	싿 C2FF	쌂 C302	쌋 C30B	쌑 C311	쌱 C331	쌴 C334	썀 C340	썅 C345	썯 C36F	쎂 C382	썪 C36A	쎡 C3A1
524x/D2Cx	쎤 C3A4	쎰 C3B0	쎱 C3B1	쎵 C3B5	쏫 C3EB	쑉 C449	쑌 C44C	쑫 C46B	쑷 C477	쑾 C47E	쓕 C4D5	쓘 C4D8	쓜 C4DC	쓩 C4E9	쓷 C4F7	씃 C503
525x/D2Dx	씅 C505	씯 C52F	씱 C531	씿 C53F	쌛 C31B	쌧 C327	쌨 C328	쎋 C38B	쎔 C394	쎕 C395	쎗 C397	쎘 C398	쎼 C3BC	쏑 C3D1	쐳 C433	쐿 C43F
526x/D2Ex	쑁 C441	쑀 C440	쒼 C4BC	쓈 C4C8	씐 C510	씔 C514	씜 C51C	씝 C51D	씡 C521	쏵 C3F5	쏸 C3F8	쏻 C3FB	쐉 C409	쒇 C487	쒓 C493	쐗 C417
527x/D2Fx	쐣 C423	쐤 C424	쒠 C4A0	쒣 C4A3	쒤 C4A4	쒬 C4AC	쒭 C4AD	쒰 C4B0	짣 C9E3	짞 C9DE	쨕 CA15	쨘 CA18	쨥 CA25	쨩 CA29	쨭 CA2D	
532x/D3Ax		쩓 CA53	쩗 CA57	쩧 CA67	쪅 CA85	쪈 CA88	쪌 CA8C	쪔 CA94	쪕 CA95	쪙 CA99	쫃 CAC3	쫆 CAC6	쫗 CAD7	쬭 CB2D	쬴 CB34	쬼 CB3C
533x/D3Bx	쬽 CB3D	쭁 CB41	쭒 CB52	쯀 CBC0	쯍 CBCD	쯕 CBD5	쯛 CBDB	쯜 CBDC	쯥 CBE5	쯩 CBE9	찓 CC13	짿 C9FF	쩩 CA69	쩯 CA6F	쩸 CA78	쩹 CA79
534x/D3Cx	쩻 CA7B	쪤 CAA4	쪵 CAB5	쬗 CB17	쬣 CB23	쬥 CB25	쮜 CB9C	쯰 CBF0	찆 CC06	쫜 CADC	쫴 CAF4	쫵 CAF5	쫻 CAFB	쬈 CB08	쮀 CB80	쮄 CB84
535x/D3Dx	쮇 CB87	쮈 CB88	쮐 CB90	쮑 CB91	쮓 CB93	쮔 CB94	앋 C54B	앏 C54F	앒 C552	앛 C55B	앝 C55D	앟 C55F	얃 C583	얒 C592	얶 C5B6	엱 C5F1
536x/D3Ex	엸 C5F8	옫 C62B	옺 C63A	욘 C698	욛 C69B	욜 C69C	욥 C6A5	욧 C6A7	욷 C6B7	욹 C6B9	욼 C6BC	웆 C6C6	웇 C6C7	웉 C6C9	윧 C727	윰 C730
537x/D3Fx	윱 C731	윳 C733	윹 C739	읅 C745	읆 C746	읇 C747	읎 C74E	읻 C77B	읾 C77E	잀 C780	잆 C786	잋 C78B	앧 C567	앱 C571	앳 C573	
542x/D4Ax		얟 C59F	얨 C5A8	얩 C5A9	얫 C5AB	얭 C5AD	엗 C5D7	엡 C5E1	엤 C5E4	옉 C609	옏 C60F	옐 C610	옝 C61D	왹 C679	왿 C67F	욌 C68C
543x/D4Bx	윅 C705	윋 C70B	윕 C715	읜 C75C	읟 C75F	읠 C760	읫 C76B	읭 C76D	왇 C647	왐 C650	왑 C651	왙 C659	웓 C6D3	웘 C6D8	웝 C6DD	웟 C6DF
544x/D4Cx	왠 C660	왣 C663	왤 C664	왯 C66F	웯 C6EF	웸 C6F8	웹 C6F9	웻 C6FB	웼 C6FC							
545x/D4Dx																
546x/D4Ex																
547x/D4Fx																

=== Statistics by jamo ===
Initial consonants

Jamo	Count
ㄱ	237
ㄴ	205
ㄷ	194
ㄹ	174
ㅁ	182
ㅂ	189
ㅅ	214
ㅈ	210
ㅊ	148
ㅋ	136
ㅌ	156
ㅍ	144
ㅎ	188
ㄲ	180
ㄸ	148
ㅃ	110
ㅆ	153
ㅉ	142
ㅇ	263
Total	3373

Vowels

Jamo	Count
ㅏ	298
ㅑ	116
ㅓ	255
ㅕ	220
ㅗ	234
ㅛ	116
ㅜ	218
ㅠ	116
ㅡ	234
ㅣ	234
ㅐ	197
ㅒ	25
ㅔ	192
ㅖ	90
ㅚ	157
ㅟ	126
ㅢ	102
ㅘ	126
ㅝ	94
ㅙ	81
ㅞ	142
Total	3373

Final consonants

Jamo	Count
(none)	377
ㄱ	273
ㄳ	16
ㄴ	340
ㄵ	4
ㄶ	15
ㄷ	262
ㄹ	321
ㄺ	47
ㄻ	59
ㄼ	30
ㄽ	44
ㄾ	3
ㄿ	4
ㅀ	18
ㅁ	295
ㅂ	272
ㅄ	8
ㅅ	269
ㅇ	319
ㅈ	50
ㅊ	42
ㅋ	9
ㅌ	61
ㅍ	37
ㅎ	42
ㄲ	19
ㅆ	137
Total	3373
