= 김 =

김 is a Korean hangul character, which can be romanized as gim or kim. It may refer to:

- Gim (food)
- Kim (Korean surname)

== Computing codes ==
Character information
Preview	김	
Unicode name	HANGUL SYLLABLE GIM	
Encodings	decimal	hex
Unicode	44608	U+AE40
UTF-8	234 185 128	EA B9 80
Numeric character reference	&#44608;	&#xAE40;
EUC-KR (KS X 1001)	177 232	B1 E8
EUC-KP (KPS 9566)	177 174	B1 AE
GB 12052	177 164	B1 A4

== See also ==
- Hangul Syllables, the Unicode block containing this character
