= Vertical Forms =

- Range: U+FE10..U+FE1F (16 code points)
- Plane: BMP
- Scripts: Common
- Symbol sets: Vertical punctuation
- Assigned: 10 code points
- Unused: 6 reserved code points
- Source standards: GB 18030

Unicode version history
- 4.1 (2005): 10 (+10)

Unicode documentation
- Code chart ∣ Web page

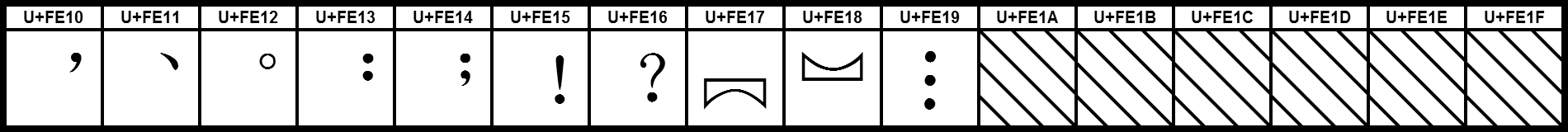
Graphical representation of the Vertical Forms Unicode block

Vertical Forms is a Unicode block containing vertical punctuation for compatibility characters with the Chinese Standard GB 18030.

In the Unicode specification, U+FE18 ︘ PRESENTATION FORM FOR VERTICAL RIGHT WHITE LENTICULAR BRAKCET has a typo in its name; "BRACKET" is spelt as "BRAKCET".

Vertical Forms^{[1]}^{[2]} Official Unicode Consortium code chart (PDF)
	0	1	2	3	4	5	6	7	8	9	A	B	C	D	E	F
U+FE1x	︐	︑	︒	︓	︔	︕	︖	︗	︘	︙						
Notes: 1. As of Unicode version 16.0; 2. Grey areas indicate non-assigned code points

== History ==
The following Unicode-related documents record the purpose and process of defining specific characters in the Vertical Forms block:

Version	Final code points (Note: Proposed code points and characters names may differ from final code points and names)	Count	L2 ID	WG2 ID	Document
4.1	U+FE10..FE19	10	L2/03-411		Goldsmith, Deborah; Muller, Eric (2003-10-31), Unencoded chars in GB 18030 & HK-SCS
4.1	U+FE10..FE19	10	L2/04-161R	N2807	Suignard, Michel; Muller, Eric; Jenkins, John (2004-06-17), HKSCS and GB 18030 PUA characters, background document
4.1	U+FE10..FE19	10	L2/04-263	N2808	Suignard, Michel (2004-06-17), HKSCS and GB 18030 PUA characters, request for additional characters and related information
4.1	U+FE10..FE19	10	L2/05-137		Freytag, Asmus (2005-05-10), Handling "defective" names
4.1	U+FE10..FE19	10	L2/05-108R		Moore, Lisa (2005-08-26), "Consensus 103-C7", UTC #103 Minutes, "Create a "Normative Name Alias" property and file in the UCD. Populate the property with names from the sections "Typos" and "Bad or misleading names" from document L2/05-137."

== See also ==
- CJK Compatibility Forms, contains additional vertical compatibility punctuation forms.
