= GB 12345 =

Traditional Chinese character set

GB 12345, entitled Code of Chinese ideogram set for information interchange supplementary set (Chinese: 信息交換用漢字編碼字符集 輔助集), is a Traditional Chinese character set standard established by China, and can be thought as the traditional counterpart of GB 2312. It is used as an encoding of traditional Chinese characters, although it is not as commonly used as Big5. It has 6,866 characters, and has no relationship nor compatibility with Big5 and CNS 11643.

== Characters ==
Characters in GB 12345 are arranged in a 94×94 grid (as in ISO/IEC 2022), and the two-byte code point of each character is expressed in the qu-wei form, which specifies a row (qu 区) and the position of the character within the row (cell, wei 位).

The rows (numbered from 1 to 94) contain characters as follows:

- 01–09: identical to GB 2312, except in row 06 position 57–85, added 29 vertical punctuation forms, and in row 08 position 27–32, added 6 pinyin characters from GB 5007.1–85, the correction of GB 2312.
- 16–87: arranged the traditional character forms which replaced their simplified forms from GB 2312.
- 88–89: 103 Chinese characters which is merged due to the simplification of Chinese characters.

The rows 10–15 and 90–94 are unassigned.

== Encodings ==
The specification for the ISO-2022-CN-EXT encoding states that the sequence ESC $ ) followed by a yet-undetermined byte (shown by the placeholder <X12345>) can be used to indicate GB 12345 characters, similarly to the sequence ESC $ ) A (also with the ESC $ ) prefix) indicating GB 2312, but only after it receives a registration in the ISO-IR registry specifying what the final byte of the sequence is. As of 2023, no such registration exists. However, the same Request for Comments also defines the encoding label CN-GB-12345 for GB 12345 used with ASCII in a manner analogous to EUC-CN.

== Inclusion of non-standard Traditional Chinese characters ==
GB/T 12345 includes a few traditional characters which are different from the table of correspondences between Simplified Chinese characters and Traditional Chinese characters in the standard General List of Simplified Chinese Characters.

- 隷 (33-05): The traditional counterpart of 隶 is 隸. 隷 is listed as a variant form in the First List of Processed Variant Chinese Characters.
- 𨻶 (47-22): 隙 has no traditional correspondence in the standard.
- 鳧 (57-76): The traditional counterpart of 凫 is 鳬. 鳧 is not in the First List of Processed Variant Chinese Characters either.

== GB 12345 and Unicode ==
The characters in GB 12345 were taken as one of the sources for the Han unification which led to the unified set of CJK characters in the initial ISO 10646/Unicode standard. All the 6,866 Chinese characters were incorporated.

== See also ==
- GB/T 2312–80
- GB 13000
- GBK
- GB 18030
