= CJK Compatibility Forms =

- Range: U+FE30..U+FE4F (32 code points)
- Plane: BMP
- Scripts: Common
- Assigned: 32 code points
- Unused: 0 reserved code points
- Source standards: CNS 11643

Unicode version history
- 1.0.0 (1991): 28 (+28)
- 3.2 (2002): 30 (+2)
- 4.0 (2003): 32 (+2)

Unicode documentation
- Code chart ∣ Web page

CJK Compatibility Forms is a Unicode block containing vertical glyph variants for east Asian compatibility. Its block name in Unicode 1.0 was CNS 11643 Compatibility, in reference to CNS 11643.

CJK Compatibility Forms^{[1]} Official Unicode Consortium code chart (PDF)
	0	1	2	3	4	5	6	7	8	9	A	B	C	D	E	F
U+FE3x	︰	︱	︲	︳	︴	︵	︶	︷	︸	︹	︺	︻	︼	︽	︾	︿
U+FE4x	﹀	﹁	﹂	﹃	﹄	﹅	﹆	﹇	﹈	﹉	﹊	﹋	﹌	﹍	﹎	﹏
Notes: 1. As of Unicode version 16.0

== History ==
The following Unicode-related documents record the purpose and process of defining specific characters in the CJK Compatibility Forms block:

Version	Final code points (Note: Proposed code points and characters names may differ from final code points and names)	Count	L2 ID	WG2 ID	Document
1.0.0	U+FE30..FE44, FE49..FE4F	28			(to be determined)
3.2	U+FE45..FE46	2	L2/99-238		Consolidated document containing 6 Japanese proposals, 1999-07-15
3.2	U+FE45..FE46	2		N2092	Addition of forty eight characters, 1999-09-13
3.2	U+FE45..FE46	2	L2/00-024		Shibano, Kohji (2000-01-31), JCS proposal revised
3.2	U+FE45..FE46	2	L2/00-098, L2/00-098-page5	N2195	Rationale for non-Kanji characters proposed by JCS committee, 2000-03-15
3.2	U+FE45..FE46	2	L2/00-234	N2203 (rtf, txt)	Umamaheswaran, V. S. (2000-07-21), "8.20", Minutes from the SC2/WG2 meeting in Beijing, 2000-03-21 -- 24
3.2	U+FE45..FE46	2	L2/01-114	N2328	Summary of Voting on SC 2 N 3503, ISO/IEC 10646-1: 2000/PDAM 1, 2001-03-09
4.0	U+FE47..FE48	2	L2/99-353	N2056	"3", Amendment of the part concerning the Korean characters in ISO/IEC 10646-1:1998 amendment 5, 1999-07-29
4.0	U+FE47..FE48	2	L2/99-380		Proposal for a New Work item (NP) to amend the Korean part in ISO/IEC 10646-1:1993, 1999-12-07
4.0	U+FE47..FE48	2	L2/99-380.3		Annex B, Special characters compatible with KPS 9566-97 (To be extended), 1999-12-07
4.0	U+FE47..FE48	2	L2/00-084	N2182	"3", Amendment of the part concerning the Korean characters in ISO/IEC 10646-1:1998 amendment 5 (Cover page and outline of proposal L2/99-380), 1999-12-07
4.0	U+FE47..FE48	2	L2/99-382		Whistler, Ken (1999-12-09), "2.3", Comments to accompany a U.S. NO vote on JTC1 N5999, SC2 N3393, New Work item proposal (NP) for an amendment of the Korean part of ISO/IEC 10646-1:1993
4.0	U+FE47..FE48	2	L2/00-066	N2170 (pdf, doc)	"3", The technical justification of the proposal to amend the Korean character part of ISO/IEC 10646-1 (proposed addition of 79 symbolic characters), 2000-02-10
4.0	U+FE47..FE48	2	L2/00-073	N2167	Karlsson, Kent (2000-03-02), Comments on DPRK New Work Item proposal on Korean characters
4.0	U+FE47..FE48	2	L2/00-285	N2244	Proposal for the Addition of 82 Symbols to ISO/IEC 10646-1:2000, 2000-08-10
4.0	U+FE47..FE48	2	L2/00-291		Everson, Michael (2000-08-30), Comments to Korean proposals (L2/00-284 - 289)
4.0	U+FE47..FE48	2		N2282	Report of the meeting of the Korean script ad hoc group, 2000-09-21
4.0	U+FE47..FE48	2	L2/01-349	N2374R	Proposal to add of 70 symbols to ISO/IEC 10646-1:2000, 2001-09-03
4.0	U+FE47..FE48	2	L2/01-387	N2390	Kim, Kyongsok (2001-10-13), ROK's Comments about DPRK's proposal, WG2 N 2374, to add 70 symbols to ISO/IEC 10646-1:2000
4.0	U+FE47..FE48	2	L2/01-388	N2392	Kim, Kyongsok (2001-10-16), A Report of Korean Script ad hoc group meeting on Oct. 15, 2001
4.0	U+FE47..FE48	2	L2/01-420		Whistler, Ken (2001-10-30), "f. Miscellaneous symbol additions from DPRK standard", WG2 (Singapore) Resolution Consent Docket for UTC
4.0	U+FE47..FE48	2	L2/01-458	N2407	Umamaheswaran, V. S. (2001-11-16), Request to Korean ad hoc group to generate mapping tables between ROK and DPRK national standards
4.0	U+FE47..FE48	2	L2/02-372	N2453 (pdf, doc)	Umamaheswaran, V. S. (2002-10-30), "T.12", Unconfirmed minutes of WG 2 meeting 42

== See also ==
- CJK Unified Ideographs
- Vertical Forms
