= CNS 11643 =

National standard coded character set of the Republic of China (Taiwan)

- Alias(es): CSIC (Chinese Standard Interchange Code)
- Language: Traditional Chinese
- Standard: CNS 11643
- Classification: ISO 2022, DBCS, CJK encoding
- Encoding formats: EUC-TW (all planes); ISO-2022-CN-EXT (planes 1–7); ISO-2022-CN (planes 1 and 2); MS-20000 (planes 1 and 2); Big5 (planes 2 and most of 1)
- Other related encodings: Big5, CCCII

The CNS 11643 character set (Chinese National Standard 11643), also officially known as the Chinese Standard Interchange Code or CSIC (Chinese: 中文標準交換碼), is officially the standard character set of Taiwan (Republic of China). Published and draft editions of CNS 11643 remain the source standards for Unicode reference glyphs for CJK Unified Ideographs submitted for use in Taiwan, and the character repertoire of CNS 11643 continues to be updated and used for administrative purposes in Taiwan.

EUC-TW is an encoded representation of CNS 11643 and ASCII in Extended Unix Code (EUC) form. In practice, variants of the Big5 character set, which is closely related to the first two planes of CNS 11643, served as the de facto standard encoding for Traditional Chinese before the introduction of Unicode. Other encodings capable of representing certain CSIC planes include ISO-2022-CN (planes 1 and 2) and ISO-2022-CN-EXT (planes 1 through 7).

== Structure ==
CNS 11643 is designed to conform to ISO 2022, although only the first seven 94×94-character planes have ISO-IR registrations. The total number of planes has varied with successive revisions of the standard; the most recent pending drafts have 19 planes, so the maximum possible number of encodable characters across all planes is 19×94×94 = 167884. Planes 1 through 7 are defined by the standard; since 2007, planes 10 through 15 have also been defined by the standard. Prior to this, planes 12 to 15 (35344 code points) were specifically designated for user-defined characters. Unlike CCCII, the encoding of variant characters in CNS 11643 is not related.

== History ==
The first edition of the standard was published in 1986, and included planes 1 and 2, deriving from levels 1 and 2 of Big5, with some re-ordering due to corrected stroke counts, two duplicate characters being omitted, and the addition of 213 classical radicals in plane 1 (out of 214 Kangxi radicals, of which 210 are effectively duplicates of existing Big5 characters and the remaining three of HKSCS characters; see also Kangxi Radicals (Unicode block)). Extensions to the standard were subsequently published in 1988 (6319 characters, occupying plane 14) and 1990 (7169 characters, occupying plane 15).

Unicode 1.0.0, although it did not yet include hanzi, included characters for compatibility with CNS 11643: the CJK Compatibility Forms block was titled "CNS 11643 Compatibility" in Unicode 1.0.0. When the Unicode CJK Unified Ideographs set was being compiled for Unicode 1.0.1, the national bodies submitted character sets to the CJK Joint Research Group for inclusion. The version of CNS 11643 submitted included the plane 14 extension, in addition to further desired characters appended to plane 14 (after 68–21, the last used code point in the standard version of the extension).

In the second edition of the standard, published in 1992, a much larger collection of hanzi was defined across seven planes. The majority of the 1988 plane 14 extension, comprising the 6148 code points 01-01 through 66–38, was adopted as plane 3 (with the remaining 171 characters, code points 66-39 through 68–21, being instead distributed amongst plane 4). The plane 15 extension was not included, although 338 of its characters were included amongst planes 4 through 7.

The third edition of the standard, published in 2007, added the Euro sign, ideographic zero, kana and extensions to the existing bopomofo and Roman alphabet support to plane 1. It introduced planes 10 through 14, containing additional hanzi, and incorporated the existing plane 15 extension into the standard itself (with gaps left where the characters already existed in planes 4 through 7). It also added 128 further hanzi to plane 3, starting at code point 68–40, based on the additions to the version of the 1988 plane 14 which had been submitted for inclusion in Unicode.

=== Plane numbering ===
CNS 11643 plane numbering in different editions, drafts or implementations
Plane	T1	T2	(UDC)	(IBM)	T3	TF	T4	T5	T6	T7	(Post-1992)	(Post-2007)
ISO-IR	171	172	-	-	183 (Note: 01-01—66-38 range only)	-	184	185	186	187	-	-
1986 edition	1	2	12–15	-	-	-	-	-	-	-	-	-
IBM code page 964	1	2	12	13	-	-	-	-	-	-	-	-
1988 extension	1	2	12–13	-	14 (Note: 01-01—66-38 and 66-39—68-21 ranges)	-	-	-	-	-	-	-
1990 extension	1	2	12–13	-	14	15	-	-	-	-	-	-
CJK-JRG version	1	2	-	-	14 (Note: 01-01—66-38, 66-39—68-21 and 68-40—71-10 ranges)	-	-	-	-	-	-	-
1992 edition	1	2	12–15	-	3	-	4	5	6	7	-	-
ICU 2000	1	2	-	-	3 (Note: 01-01—66-38 and 68-40—71-10 ranges)	9	4	5	6	7	-	-
2007 edition	1	2	-	-	3	15	4	5	6	7	8–14	-
ICU 2014	1	2	12	13	3	15	4	5	6	7	-	-
Post-2007	1	2	-	-	3 (Note: 01-01—66-38 and 68-40—71-10 ranges, plus additions)	15	4	5	6	7	8–14	16–19

== Current purpose and relationship to Unicode ==
The CNS 11643 repertoire includes characters used for administrative purposes in Taiwan, including household registration and ID cards, in addition to characters used in education. In particular, characters in planes 1 and 2 are used in education. Only the characters used in education are subjected to glyph-form normalisation in CNS 11643. It continues to be expanded, with additional planes numbered up to 19 having been drafted, but not yet published as part of a CNS 11643 edition. A 2022 amendment to the 2007 edition appended U+7934 礴 CJK UNIFIED IDEOGRAPH-7934 to the end of plane 2, and corrected several glyph forms in planes 1 and 2.

Although the 1992 and 2007 editions of CNS 11643, in addition to more recent working drafts, serve as the Unihan sources for reference glyphs for CJK Unified Ideographs submitted for use in Taiwan, there remains, as of 2017, several thousand CNS 11643 characters with no corresponding Unicode character, or which do not round-trip through Unicode, mostly in planes 10 through 14. These are mapped to the Unicode Supplementary Private Use Area.

In some cases, two or more CNS 11643 characters correspond to a single Unicode CJK Unified Ideograph. These cases are (except where covered by the CJK Compatibility Ideographs Supplement block) currently mapped to Unicode Supplementary Private Use Area code points, but the Taipei Computer Association, participating in the Ideographic Research Group, has been evaluating the feasibility of registering them as Ideographic Variation Sequences at some point in the future.

== Relationship to Big5 ==
Levels 1 and 2 of the Big5 encoding correspond mostly to CNS 11643 planes 1 and 2, respectively, with occasional differences in order, and with two duplicate hanzi existing in Big5 but not in CNS 11643. They can be mapped using a list of ranges. However, the 213 classical radicals in CNS 11643 plane 1 are additional to the characters available in Big5 (although they can be lossily mapped to the corresponding hanzi characters in Big5 or HKSCS), and further additional characters were added to CNS 11643 plane 1 in 2007. The Big5-2003 variant of Big5 is defined as a partial encoding of CNS 11643.

Within the Big5 hanzi repertoire, only one plane 1 character is conventionally mapped to Unicode differently from the corresponding character from the first two CNS 11643 planes: to U+5F5D (彝), whereas its CNS plane 1 counterpart is mapped to a related variant at U+5F5E (彞); U+5F5D is separately included in CNS 11643 plane 3. However, some variant mappings for Big5, such as some defined by IBM, include U+5F5E rather than U+5F5D. Similarly, a single character from Big5 level 2 (including its IBM variant) is mapped to a different Unicode code point than its CNS 11643 plane 2 counterpart: to U+5284 (劄), while the Unihan database currently maps the CNS 11643 character to U+7B9A (箚); U+5284 appears in CNS 11643 plane 14.
