= Transcription into Japanese =

Mapping of foreign sounds into Japanese

In contemporary Japanese writing, foreign-language loanwords and foreign names are normally written in the katakana script, which is one component of the Japanese writing system. As far as possible, sounds in the source language are matched to the nearest sounds in the Japanese language, and the result is transcribed using standard katakana characters, each of which represents one syllable (strictly mora). For example, America is written アメリカ (A-me-ri-ka). To accommodate various foreign-language sounds not present in Japanese, a system of extended katakana has also developed to augment standard katakana.

A much less common form of transcription, Ateji, uses kanji characters for their phonetic values.

== Common conventions ==
=== Syllable structure ===
Since Japanese has few closed syllables, syllable-final consonants in the source language are often represented using the -u (or sometimes -o or -i) kanas with implicitly silent vowels – though this vowel often is pronounced in Japanese – or the syllable coda is not represented at all. For example, the name Jim is written ジム (Ji-mu). A similar principle applies to consonant clusters; for example spring would be transcribed as スプリング (su-pu-ri-n-gu), and scratch would be transcribed as スクラッチ (su-ku-ra-tchi).

=== Diphthongs and long vowels ===
Japanese has only five native vowel sounds, each a pure vowel (monophthong) with a long and short form, and some degree of approximation is necessary when representing vowels from, for example, English. Diphthongs are represented by vowel sequences, as in ブラウン Bu-ra-u-n "Brown", ナイス na-i-su "nice", ディア di-a "dear/deer", レア re-a "rare". etc. The English spelling <ore> (phonologically /ɔː/ (RP) or /ɔːr/ (GA)) is usually "diphthongized" as o-a in Japanese (e.g. コア ko-a "core"), possibly because it is also pronounced as a diphthong (/oə/) in some accents of English. English /eɪ/ is transcribed to either e-e (エース e-e-su "ace") or e-i (スペイン Su-pe-i-n "Spain"); similarly, /əʊ/ is transcribed to either o-o (ショー sho-o "show") or o-u (シャドウ sha-do-u "shadow").

Long vowels are generally written with ー to indicate lengthening, as in コーラ kōra (cola), rather than writing a distinct vowel ×コウラ *koura. There are two irregularities of note here. Firstly, lengthening of the final vowel may be ambiguous, and vary over time or between users. For example, in present Japan, "computer" is generally represented as コンピューター konpyūtā (long final), but in some cases, such as the computer industry, following Japanese Industrial Standards, it is represented as コンピュータ konpyūta (short final). Secondly, in modern Chinese loanwords, notably food names, in careful transcription diphthongs are represented by separate vowels, even if in Japanese they would appear to be a long vowel; this is particularly common with òu, especially in 豆 dòu "(soy) bean", usually rendered as トウ. Further, long vowels in the Japanese transcription need not reflect Chinese pronunciation. For example, the dish 東坡肉 "Dongpo pork", in pinyin dōngpōròu (dōng·pō·ròu), is represented in Japanese as ドンポーロウ donpōrou, or more commonly トンポーロウ tonpōrou. Note that in Chinese pinyin ō represents a high tone, while in Japanese ō represents a long vowel, and /d/ is pronounced differently (Chinese /d/ is similar to Japanese or English /t/). This distinction is not always followed, and varies by term: the spelling トンポーロー tonpōrō is also common; and in terms such as 回鍋肉 twice cooked pork, the spelling ホイコーロー is more common, despite representing diphthongs.

Although the diphthong /au/ across languages is usually transcribed as アウ a-u, local reading transcriptions of the same sequence from Mandarin, represented in both Wade–Giles and Pinyin as ao are represented as アオ a-o instead, again in more of a manner of transliteration based on these systems - e.g. マオ・ツォートン ma-o tso-o-to-n (Mao Zedong).

=== Consonants ===
Japanese does not have separate l and r sounds, and l- is normally transcribed using the kana that are perceived as representing r-. For example, London becomes ロンドン (Ro-n-do-n). Other sounds not present in Japanese may be converted to the nearest Japanese equivalent; for example, the name Smith is written スミス (Su-mi-su). Foreign sounds can be difficult to express in Japanese, resulting in spellings such as フルシチョフ Furushichofu (Khrushchev), アリー・ハーメネイー Arī Hāmeneī (Ali Khamenei) and イツハク・パールマン Itsuhaku Pāruman or イツァーク・パールマン Itsāku Pāruman (Itzhak Perlman).

The phoneme /v/ in various languages is transcribed either to b or v, although it is unknown whether there is such an equivalent phoneme /v/ in Japanese. For example, ベネチア Benechia / ヴェネツィア Ve-ne-tsi-a "Venezia" (Italian for "Venice"), オーバー o-o-ba-a "over", ラブ ra-bu / ラヴ ravu "love".

Wa is usually written as ワ, although ウァ is sometimes used in transcriptions from Ancient Greek or Latin (e.g. ミネルウァ Mi-ne-ru-wa "Minerva").

Geminated consonants are typically transcribed consistently and faithfully, as gemination is also featured in Japanese. The only notable exceptions are /rr/ and /ɲɲ/, although /ll/ and /ʎʎ/ are still transcribed. Examples: Arabic: الله, romanized: Allāh is アッラーフ A-r-ra-a-fu; Italian Donatello is ドナテッロ Do-na-te-r-ro; Italian degli is デッリ de-r-ri; but Italian Verrocchio is simply ヴェロッキオ Ve-ro-k-ki-o, not *Ve-r-ro-k-ki-o. Italian /ɲɲ/ may be transcribed as the lengthened portion of the preceding vowel and a sequence of /nj/. For example, Sardegna is サルデーニャ Sa-ru-de-e-nya.

Plain short consonants may be transcribed as geminated consonants to reflect the laxness of the preceding vowel, although this is not universal and there are plenty of exceptions. For example: English kick is キック ki-k-ku and castle is キャッスル kya-s-su-ru, but extra is エクストラ e-ku-su-to-ra and battle is バトル ba-to-ru. This practice expands to almost all English obstruents regardless of their voicing (/k/, /ɡ/, /s/, /z/, /f/, etc.), also to German/Scots /x/, occasionally to /n/ and /m/ (as pseudo-geminated consonant sequences /nn/ or /nm/). For example: English bag is バ(ッ)グ ba-(g)-gu; English Anna is アンナ A-n-na; English gamma is ガンマ ga-n-ma; English shuffle is シャッフル sha-f-fu-ru; German Mach is マッハ ma-h-ha, Masoch is マゾッホ Ma-zo-h-ho.

German [x] is transcribed roughly as h-h, accordingly to its preceding vowel, if it's not followed by a vowel (e.g. マッハ ma-h-ha "Mach", バッハ Ba-h-ha "Bach", マゾッホ Ma-zo-h-ho "Masoch"); [ç], its allophone occurring only after high vowels and consonants, are as h if followed by a vowel (e.g. メルヘン me-ru-hen "Märchen"), or as hi if not (e.g. リヒター Ri-hi-ta-a "Richter"). Russian /x/ is transcribed as fu if not followed by a vowel (e.g. カザフスタン Ka-za-fu-su-ta-n "Kazakhstan"). Mandarin [ɕ] (in pinyin x(i)) is transcribed as sh (e.g. シャオ shao from 小 xiǎo "little").

Similar to the way speakers of English say Italian words, Japanese does not usually transcribe the Italian glide /j/ to reflect its true nature, but as /i/, perhaps for consistency and convenience. For example, Venezia is ヴェネツィア Ve-ne-tsi-a, Sicilia is シチリア Shi-chi-ri-a. Contemporary transcriptions of palatalized consonants from Slavic languages, however, are made using yōon, e.g.: Russian ピャチゴルスク Pya-chi-go-ru-su-ku (Pyatigorsk), Polish ビェルスコ=ビャワ Bye-ru-su-ko=bya-wa (Bielsko-Biała).

=== Extended katakana ===
In modern times, an extended katakana system has developed to cater for foreign sounds not present in Japanese. Most of these novel katakana forms are digraphs, composed of standard katakana characters, but in digraph combinations not found in native words. For example, the word photo is transcribed as フォト (fo-to), where the novel digraph フォ (fo) is made up from フ (normally fu) plus a novel small combining form of オ (normally o). In other cases novel diacritics may be applied to create new sounds, such as ヴ for vu, which consists of ウ (u) combined with a dakuten to indicate a voiced pronunciation.

=== Interpunct ===
Japanese is written without spaces between words, and, to aid understanding, foreign phrases and names are sometimes transliterated with an interpunct separating the words, called a nakaguro (中黒; middle dot); for example, ビル・ゲイツ (Bill Gates). When it is assumed that the reader knows the separate gairaigo words in the phrase, the middle dot is omitted, especially for wasei eigo. For example, the phrase コンピューターゲーム konpyūtā gēmu ("computer game") contains two well-known gairaigo, and therefore is not written with a middle dot; the same principle is applied for パンティストッキング panti sutokkingu ("pantyhose", lit. "panty stocking"), Japanese coinage.

=== Word length ===
Because Japanese is written with relatively complex Kanji characters, Japanese text must generally be written larger for legibility. Furthermore, as both Kanji and Kana are traditionally of equal width and height, Japanese characters are generally much larger than Latin characters. As Kanji are logographic and Kana encode entire syllables (or rather, morae), the higher information density of Japanese writing usually evens out with the larger text so that Japanese and English texts take about the same amount of space, but challenges arise with foreign consonant clusters incompatible with Japanese phonotactics and the Kana system. For example, the word remote control becomes the cumbersome リモートコントロール (ri-mō-to-ko-n-to-rō-ru) in Japanese. Here, additional vowels are added between [t] and [k], between [t] and [ɾ], and after [ɾ] at the word's end, and the vowels of mo and ro have been lengthened to mimic the English pronunciation. These additional sounds not only add to the word's length when spoken, but it also severely bloats the word when written. As such, the word is typically shortened to simply リモコン (ri-mo-ko-n) in modern Japanese speech and writing.

== Language-specific conventions ==
=== English ===
The English schwa /ə/ is variously "transcribed" to a, e, o, depending on the English spelling (this is more of transliteration than it is transcription). For example, デュアル dyu-a-ru "dual", デュエル dyu-e-ru "duel", テスタメント Te-su-ta-me-n-to "Testament", ロンドン Ro-n-do-n "London". There are no definite rules when it comes to the schwa, however; e.g. ランダム ra-n-da-mu "random", オープン o-o-pu-n "open", ザ za "the". The British /ə/ which is equivalent to the North American /ɚ/ is transcribed to a(-a); e.g. コンピュータ(ー) ko-n-pyu-u-ta(-a) "computer", モーター mo-o-ta-a "motor". On the other hand, the French schwa is transcribed to u or o (e.g. ソムリエ so-mu-ri-e "sommelier", ド do "de") similarly to instances where there's a lack of vowels, and the German schwa is almost always transcribed to e (e.g. アルベルト A-ru-be-ru-to "Albert", ウンディーネ un-di-i-ne "undine").

English /æ/ is typically transcribed to a; e.g. マップ (mappu, map). The sequences /kæ/ and /ɡæ/ are sometimes transcribed to kya and gya respectively; e.g. キャビン (kyabin, cabin), ギャラリー (gyararī, gallery).

The older English suffix -age /-ɪdʒ/ is always transcribed to -e-e-ji as if it were pronounced as /eɪdʒ/ as in "age" or "rage"; e.g. メッセージ me-s-se-e-ji "message", パッケージ pa-k-ke-e-ji "package". The more recent -age /-ɑːʒ/ is more "properly" transcribed to -a-a-ju; e.g. ミラージュ mi-ra-a-ju "mirage". However, "garage" /gəˈrɑːʒ/ is more commonly transcribed to ガレージ ga-re-e-ji as it also has /ˈgærɪdʒ/ as an alternative pronunciation in British English.

English /ti(ː)/ and /tɪ/ is typically transcribed to チ chi (e.g. チーム chīmu "team"), but ティ ti is also used (ティア tia "tear"). The suffix -tic can be transcribed to either チック -chikku or ティック -tikku. However, -ty is almost always transcribed to ティ(ー) -ti(i), not *チ(ー) *-chi(i) (e.g. パーティー pātī "party", インフィニティ infiniti "infinity").

The English voiceless labialized velar approximant /hw/ (orthographically wh), which is a distinct phoneme from /w/ in some varieties of English, can be transcribed as ho(w)-. For example, White is ホワイト Howaito, whale is ホエール hoēru.

Modern English compounds are usually transcribed in a way that reflects the independent pronunciations of the individual components. That is to say, there is no phonetic linking between components. For example, "overall" is transcribed as オーバーオール o-o-ba-a-o-o-ru, not *o-o-ba-a-ro-o-ru as it is pronounced in English. However, there are a few exceptions, such as "pineapple", which is transcribed as パイナップル pa-i-na-p-pu-ru, or "double-u", as ダブリュー da-bu-ryu-u.

=== French ===
French vowels are usually phonemically transcribed, but non-phonemic stressed vowels (utterance-final) are sometimes also transcribed as long vowels. Compare the examples of メゾン me-zo-n "maison" and カレー ka-re-e "Calais", in which the same vowel /ɛ/ is transcribed as e and e-e depending on whether it is stressed or not. The French schwa is ignored altogether: words are usually transcribed as if there were no schwa at all. For example, the word "le" is transcribed as ル ru, as is the single sound /l/ in "cheval" > シュヴァル shuvaru.

French /w/ is typically transcribed as u, but the sequence /wa/ is as o-(w)a (e.g. ポアロ Po-a-ro "Poirot").

Although a syllable-final /n/ is typically transcribed using the moraic ン n, ン is used in French to transcribe nasalized vowels, so French words with a final /n/ often use ヌ nu instead for distinction, e.g. マドレーヌ Ma-do-re-e-nu "Madeleine". This is especially the case when the masculine and feminine of a word are distinct in French, e.g. bon --> ボン bo-n, vs. bonne --> ボンヌ bo-n-nu (the n is sometimes doubled, especially when the French orthography uses two n, even if it has no consequence in the French pronunciation).

=== German ===
The German /v/ (orthographically w) can be transcribed in several ways. In long-established words, it is generally w. E.g.: Walküre "valkyrie" > ワルキューレ wa-ru-kyu-u-re. In newer transcriptions, it can also be v. E.g.: Schwestern "sisters" > シュヴェスタン shu-ve-su-tan. The schwa /ə/, spelt e, is transcribed as e, as in the aforementioned wa-ru-kyu-u-re.

== Katakana tables ==
The following tables give the Hepburn romanization and an approximate IPA transcription for katakana as used in contemporary Japanese. Their use in transcription is, of course, in the inverse direction.

=== Standard katakana ===
Katakana syllabograms
	Monographs (gojūon)					Digraphs (yōon)		
	a	i	u	e	o	ya	yu	yo
∅	ア a [a]	イ i [i]	ウ u [ɯ]	エ e [e] (Note: Prior to the e/ye merger in the mid-Heian period, a different character (𛀀) was used in position e.)	オ o [o]			
K	カ ka [ka]	キ ki [ki]	ク ku [kɯ]	ケ ke [ke]	コ ko [ko]	キャ kya [kʲa]	キュ kyu [kʲɯ]	キョ kyo [kʲo]
S	サ sa [sa]	シ shi [ɕi]	ス su [sɯ]	セ se [se]	ソ so [so]	シャ sha [ɕa]	シュ shu [ɕɯ]	ショ sho [ɕo]
T	タ ta [ta]	チ chi [t͡ɕi]	ツ tsu [t͡sɯ]	テ te [te]	ト to [to]	チャ cha [t͡ɕa]	チュ chu [t͡ɕɯ]	チョ cho [t͡ɕo]
N	ナ na [na]	ニ ni [ɲi]	ヌ nu [nɯ]	ネ ne [ne]	ノ no [no]	ニャ nya [ɲa]	ニュ nyu [ɲɯ]	ニョ nyo [ɲo]
H	ハ ha [ha]	ヒ hi [çi]	フ fu [ɸɯ]	ヘ he [he]	ホ ho [ho]	ヒャ hya [ça]	ヒュ hyu [çɯ]	ヒョ hyo [ço]
M	マ ma [ma]	ミ mi [mi]	ム mu [mɯ]	メ me [me]	モ mo [mo]	ミャ mya [mʲa]	ミュ myu [mʲɯ]	ミョ myo [mʲo]
Y	ヤ ya [ja]	(Note: Theoretical combinations yi and wu are unused . Some katakana were invented for them by linguists in the Edo and Meiji periods in order to fill out the table, but they were never actually used in normal writing.)	ユ yu [jɯ]	(Note: The combination ye existed prior to the mid-Heian period and was represented in very early katakana, but has been extinct for over a thousand years, having merged with e in the 10th century. The ye katakana (エ) was adopted for e (displacing 𛀀, the character originally used for e); the katakana 𛄡 was invented for ye in the Meiji period for use in representations of Old and Early Classical Japanese so as to avoid confusion with the modern use of エ for e.)	ヨ yo [jo]			
R	ラ ra [ɾa]	リ ri [ɾi]	ル ru [ɾɯ]	レ re [ɾe]	ロ ro [ɾo]	リャ rya [ɾʲa]	リュ ryu [ɾʲɯ]	リョ ryo [ɾʲo]
W	ワ wa [wa]	(Note: The characters in positions wi and we are obsolete in modern Japanese, and have been replaced by イ (i) and エ (e). The character wo, in practice normally pronounced o, is preserved in only one use: as a particle. This is normally written in hiragana (を), so katakana ヲ sees only limited use. See Gojūon and the articles on each character for details.)			ヲ wo [wo]			
	Monographs with diacritics: gojūon with (han)dakuten					Digraphs with diacritics: yōon with (han)dakuten		
	a	i	u	e	o	ya	yu	yo
G	ガ ga [ɡa]	ギ gi [ɡi]	グ gu [ɡɯ]	ゲ ge [ɡe]	ゴ go [ɡo]	ギャ gya [ɡʲa]	ギュ gyu [ɡʲɯ]	ギョ gyo [ɡʲo]
Z	ザ za [(d)za]	ジ ji [(d)ʑi]	ズ zu [(d)zɯ]	ゼ ze [(d)ze]	ゾ zo [(d)zo]	ジャ ja [(d)ʑa]	ジュ ju [(d)ʑɯ]	ジョ jo [(d)ʑo]
D	ダ da [da]	(Note: The ヂ (di) and ヅ (du) kana (often romanised as ji and zu) are primarily used for etymological spelling , when the unvoiced equivalents チ (ti) and ツ (tu) (usually romanised as chi and tsu) undergo a sound change (rendaku) and become voiced when they occur in the middle of a compound word. In other cases, the identically-pronounced ジ (ji) and ズ (zu) are used instead. ヂ (di) and ヅ (du) can never begin a word, and they are not common in katakana, since the concept of rendaku does not apply to transcribed foreign words, one of the major uses of katakana.)		デ de [de]	ド do [do]			
B	バ ba [ba]	ビ bi [bi]	ブ bu [bɯ]	ベ be [be]	ボ bo [bo]	ビャ bya [bʲa]	ビュ byu [bʲɯ]	ビョ byo [bʲo]
P	パ pa [pa]	ピ pi [pi]	プ pu [pɯ]	ペ pe [pe]	ポ po [po]	ピャ pya [pʲa]	ピュ pyu [pʲɯ]	ピョ pyo [pʲo]
	Final nasal monograph	Polysyllabic monographs						
	n	iu	koto	shite	toki	tomo	nari	
*	ン n [m n ɲ ŋ ɴ ɰ̃]	iu [jɯː]	ヿ koto [koto]	shite [ɕite]	/ toki [toki]	tomo [tomo]	nari [naɾi]	
*						゙ domo [domo]		
	Functional graphemes							
	sokuonfu	chōonpu	odoriji (monosyllable)	odoriji (polysyllable)				
*	ッ (indicates a geminate consonant)	ー (indicates a long vowel)	ヽ (reduplicates and unvoices syllable)	〱 (reduplicates and unvoices syllable)				
*			ヾ (reduplicates and voices syllable)	〱゙ (reduplicates and voices syllable)				
*			ヽ゚ (reduplicates and voices syllable)	〱゚ (reduplicates and voices syllable)				

=== Extended katakana ===
The following katakana tokushuon (特殊音) have been developed or proposed specifically for the purposes of transcribing foreign words. Examples such as トゥ(tu) in カートゥーン(cartoon), ティ(ti) in パーティ(party), ツァ (tsa) in モーツァルト(Mozart) are found mostly in foreign words.

Orange	General kana combinations used for loanwords or foreign place names or personal names, set forth by the Japanese government's Ministry of Education, Culture, Sports, Science and Technology (MEXT, Monbushō).
*Blue	Combinations used for more accurate transliteration of foreign sounds, again set forth by MEXT.
†Beige	Suggestions by the American National Standards Institute (ANSI Z39.11) and the British Standards Institution (BS 4812), both are identical and from 1972. Attention: In these old standards obsolete kanas like ヰ(wi) and ヱ(we) are still included, same for ヷ(va), ヸ(vi), ヹ(ve), ヺ(vo).
‡Purple	Combinations that appear in the 1974 version of the Hyōjun-shiki formatting.

Transcription katakana
	a	i	u	e	o	ya	yu	ye	yo
K								キェ kye†	
Kw	クヮ kwa*	クィ kwi*		クェ kwe*	クォ kwo*				
G								ギェ gye†	
Gw	グヮ gwa*	グィ gwi†		グェ gwe†	グォ gwo†				
S		スィ si‡						シェ she	
Z J		ズィ zi‡						ジェ je	
T		ティ ti	トゥ tu*				テュ tyu*	チェ che	
Ts	ツァ tsa	ツィ tsi*		ツェ tse	ツォ tso				
D		ディ di	ドゥ du*				デュ dyu		
N								ニェ nye†	
H			ホゥ hu‡					ヒェ hye†	
F	ファ fa	フィ fi		フェ fe	フォ fo	フャ fya†	フュ fyu*	フィェ fye†	フョ fyo†
B								ビェ bye†	
P								ピェ pye†	
M								ミェ mye†	
Y		イィ yi‡		イェ ye*					
R								リェ rye†	
W		ウィ wi*	ウゥ wu‡	ウェ we*	ウォ wo*		ウュ wyu†		
V	(ヷ) ヴァ va*	(ヸ) ヴィ vi*	ヴ vu*	(ヹ) ヴェ ve*	(ヺ) ヴォ vo*	ヴャ vya†	ヴュ vyu*	ヴィェ vye†	ヴョ vyo†

== Table of transcription from English ==
English phonemes		Common English graphemes	Japanese transcription in modified Hepburn romanization			Examples
Received Pronunciation	General American	Common English graphemes	If the English consonant is prevocalic and not postvocalic	If the English consonant is intervocalic	If the English consonant is not prevocalic	Examples
/æ/		⟨a⟩; ⟨ae⟩; ⟨al⟩; ⟨au⟩	a; ā			ハンド hando "hand"; ラム ramu "ram", "RAM"; サモン samon, サーモン sāmon "salmon" Exception: エンド endo "and"
/ɒ/; /ɔː/	/ɑː/; /ɔː/	⟨a⟩; ⟨ach⟩; ⟨au⟩; ⟨o⟩; ⟨ou⟩	o; a; ō			ノック nokku "knock"; ショップ shoppu "shop"; オラクル orakuru "oracle"; ウォリアー woriā, ウォーリアー wōriā "warrior"; ウォッチ wotchi "watch"; ヨット yotto "yacht"; ツモロー tsumorō, トゥモロー tumorō "tomorrow"; コロンビア Koronbia "Colombia"; サッカー sakkā "soccer"; カレッジ karejji "college"; カクテル kakuteru "cocktail"; カリフラワー karifurawā "cauliflower"; バレーボール barēbōru "volleyball"; ライノセラス rainoserasu "rhinoceros"; ドール dōru "doll"; ウォーター wōtā "water"; ゴーグル gōguru "goggle"; トーマス Tōmasu "Thomas"
/ɑː/	/æ/; /ɑː/	⟨a⟩; ⟨al⟩; ⟨au⟩	ā, a			アーント ānto "aunt"; ハーフ hāfu "half"; バス basu "bath"; ファスト fasuto, ファースト fāsuto "fast"; シカゴ Shikago "Chicago"; ダンス dansu "dance"
/ɑː(ɹ)/	/ɑːɹ/	⟨ar⟩; ⟨ear⟩; ⟨er⟩		ār; a	ā	カー kā "car"; マーカー mākā "marker"; ハート hāto "heart"; サージェント sājento "sergeant"; マーマレード māmarēdo, ママレード mamarēdo "marmalade"
/aɪ/		⟨ai⟩; ⟨ei⟩; ⟨eigh⟩; ⟨i⟩; ⟨ic⟩; ⟨ie⟩; ⟨igh⟩; ⟨is⟩; ⟨oy⟩; ⟨uy⟩; ⟨y⟩; ⟨ye⟩	ai			ハイ hai "high", "hi"; ライト raito "right", "light"; ガイ gai "guy"; ガイド gaido "guide"; スタイル sutairu "style"; ハイト haito "height"
/aɪə(ɹ)/	/aɪɚ/; /aɪ/	⟨ia(r)⟩; ⟨igher⟩; ⟨ire⟩; ⟨iro⟩		aiar; aiyar	aia; aiā; aiya; aiyā	ファイアー faiā, ファイヤー faiyā "fire"; アイアン aian "iron"; ダイアリー daiarī, ダイヤリー daiyarī "diary"; ダイヤモンド daiyamondo "diamond" Exceptions: アイルランド Airurando "Ireland"; アイロン airon "iron"
/aɪl/	/l/	⟨ile⟩			airu, uru, oru	ミサイル misairu "missile"; レプタイル reputairu, レプトル reputoru "reptile"
/aʊ/		⟨au⟩; ⟨ou⟩; ⟨ough⟩; ⟨ow⟩	au; a			タウン taun "town"; ダウン daun "down"; プラウ purau "plough", "plow"; ファウンデーション faundēshon, ファンデーション fandēshon "foundation"
/aʊə(ɹ)/	/aʊɚ/	⟨our⟩; ⟨ower⟩		awār	awā	パワー pawā "power"; アワー awā "our", "hour"
/b/		⟨b⟩; ⟨bb⟩; ⟨be⟩; ⟨pb⟩	b	b; bb	bu; bbu	ベンチ benchi "bench"; バッブル babburu "bubble"; ラブ rabu "lab"; ブラザー burazā "brother"; ブレイク Bureiku "Blake"; Exception: カップボード kappubōdo "cupboard"
/d/		⟨d⟩; ⟨dd⟩; ⟨de⟩	d	d; dd; j	do; ddo; zu; zzu; tto	デス desu "death"; ベッド beddo "bed"; サンデー Sandē "Sunday"; ドゥーム dūmu "doom"; ドラゴン doragon "dragon"; キッド kiddo, キッズ kizzu "kid"; リドラー Ridorā "Riddler"; ゼット zetto "zed"; アンデッド andeddo, アンデット andetto "undead"; エジソン Ejison, エディソン Edison, エディスン Edisun "Edison"; クレジット kurejitto "credit"
/dju(ː)/	/du(ː)/; /dʒə/	⟨dew⟩; ⟨du⟩; ⟨due⟩	dyū; dyu			デューク dyūku "duke"; デュアル dyuaru "dual"; デュエル dyueru "duel"; デュー dyū "dew", "due"; エデュケーション edyukēshon "education"
/dz/		⟨ds⟩; ⟨dds⟩			zu; zzu	エイズ eizu "AIDS"; キッズ kizzu "kids"; グッズ guzzu "goods"
/dʒ/		⟨di⟩; ⟨dg⟩; ⟨dge⟩; ⟨g⟩; ⟨ge⟩; ⟨j⟩	j	j; jj; z	ji; jji; tsu	ジャンプ janpu "jump"; エッジ ejji "edge"; ジェリー Jerī "Gerry", "Jerry"; バジェット bajetto "budget"; ガレージ garēji "garage"; ソルジャー sorujā "soldier"; エンジェル enjeru, エンゼル enzeru "angel"; ジェミナイ, ヂェミナイ Jeminai "Gemini"; キャベツ kyabetsu "cabbage"
/ð/		⟨th⟩; ⟨the⟩	z; j		zu	ザ za, ジー jī "the"; マザー mazā "mother"; アルゴリズム arugorizumu "algorithm"
/ɛ/		⟨ae⟩; ⟨e⟩; ⟨ea⟩; ⟨ie⟩; ⟨oe⟩	e			エンド endo "end"; ヘッド heddo "head"; フレンド furendo "friend" Exception: セーター sētā "sweater"
/ɛə(ɹ)/	/ɛɹ/	⟨ar⟩; ⟨air⟩; ⟨are⟩; ⟨ear⟩; ⟨eir⟩; ⟨ere⟩; ⟨ey're⟩		ear; er	ea; eā	エア ea, エアー eā "air"; シェア shea "share"; ベア bea "bear"; エリア eria "area" Exception: プレーリー purērī "prairie"
/ə/		⟨a⟩	a			アーカンソー Ākansō "Arkansas"; イングランド Ingurando "England"; マリガン marigan "mulligan"; アバウト abauto "about"; コンマ konma "comma" Exception: プレデター puredetā "predator"
/ə/		⟨o⟩	o; u; a			コモン komon "common"; オブ obu "of"; ツデー tsudē, トゥデー tudē "today"; ダイナソー dainasō, ダイノソー dainosō "dinosaur"; セカンド sekando "second"
/ə/		⟨gh⟩; ⟨ou⟩; ⟨ough⟩; ⟨u⟩	a			サラ sara "thorough"; バラ bara "borough"; エディンバラ Edinbara "Edinburgh"; アルバカーキ Arubakāki "Albuquerque"; ニューファンドランド Nyūfandorando "Newfoundland"
/ə(ɹ)/	/ɚ/	⟨ar⟩; ⟨er⟩; ⟨ure⟩		ar	a; ā	ハンガー hangā "hanger", "hangar"; コンピュータ konpyūta, コンピューター konpyūtā "computer"; ロバート Robāto "Robert"; フューチャー fyūchā "future"; ノーザン nōzan "northern"; プロパティ puropati "property"; ハンカチーフ hankachīfu "handkerchief"
/ə(ɹ)/	/ɚ/	⟨or⟩; ⟨our⟩		ar	ā; oru	モーター mōtā "motor"; カラー karā "colour"; カーソル kāsoru "cursor"; メルボルン Meruborun "Melbourne"
/əd/	/ɚd/	⟨oard⟩; ⟨ord⟩	ōdo			オックスフォード Okkusufōdo "Oxford"
/əl/; /l/		⟨al⟩			aru	プロポーザル puropōzaru "proposal"; ライバル raibaru "rival"; タイダル taidaru "tidal"; オフィシャル ofisharu "official"
/əl/; /l/		⟨ael⟩; ⟨el⟩; ⟨le⟩			uru; oru; eru	ベーグル bēguru "bagel"; マッスル massuru "muscle"; テーブル tēburu "table"; サイクル saikuru "cycle"; ミドル midoru "middle"; ステープル sutēpuru "staple"; ケトル ketoru "kettle"; パズル pazuru "puzzle"; パネル paneru "panel"; レベル reberu, レヴェル reveru "level", "revel", "rebel"; マイケル Maikeru "Michael"
/əm/		⟨am⟩; ⟨em⟩; ⟨om⟩; ⟨ome⟩			amu	キングダム kingudamu "kingdom"; ランダム randamu "random"; セイラム Seiramu "Salem"; ゴッサム Gossamu "Gotham"; オーサム ōsamu "awesome"
/əm/		⟨um⟩			amu; umu	アルバム arubamu "album"; オポッサム opossamu "opossum"; デューテリウム dyūteriumu "deuterium"; バキューム bakyūmu "vacuum"
/ən/; /n/		⟨ain⟩; ⟨en⟩; ⟨on⟩			un; on; en	ハイフン haifun "hyphen"; セブン sebun "seven"; フォールン fōrun "fallen"; オープン ōpun "open"; トークン tōkun "token"; リーズン rīzun "reason"; シーズン shīzun "season"; プリズン purizun "prison"; レッスン ressun "lesson"; セコンド sekondo "second"; サドン sadon "sudden"; スウェーデン Suwēden "Sweden"; マウンテン maunten "mountain"; ブリテン Buriten "Britain"; テスタメント tesutamento "testament"; ヘレン Heren "Hellen"; Exception: クライアント kuraianto "client"; セカンド sekando "second"
/əs/		⟨us⟩			asu	バイラス bairasu, ヴァイラス vairasu "virus"; コーカス Kōkasasu "Caucasus"
/əʊ/	/oʊ/	⟨au⟩; ⟨eau⟩; ⟨eaux⟩; ⟨o⟩; ⟨oa⟩; ⟨oe⟩; ⟨oh⟩; ⟨ough⟩; ⟨ow⟩; ⟨owe⟩	ō; ou; o			ゴー gō "go"; ショー shō "show"; シャドー shadō, シャドウ shadou "shadow"; ホーム hōmu "home"; ソウル souru "soul"; オハイオ Ohaio "Ohio"; ポニー ponī "pony"
/ɜː(ɹ)/	/ɜːɹ/	⟨ear⟩; ⟨er⟩; ⟨ir⟩; ⟨olo⟩; ⟨ur⟩		ār	ā; a	アース āsu "earth"; スターリング Sutāringu "Sterling", "Stirling"; バーチャル bācharu "virtual"; カーブ kābu "curve", "curb"; カーネル kāneru "colonel", "kernel"; シャツ shatsu "shirt"; オルタナティブ orutanatibu "alternative"; ファーリー fārī "furry"
/eɪ/		⟨a⟩; ⟨ae⟩; ⟨ai⟩; ⟨ais⟩; ⟨ait⟩; ⟨al⟩; ⟨au⟩; ⟨ay⟩; ⟨e⟩; ⟨ei⟩; ⟨eigh⟩; ⟨et⟩; ⟨ey⟩	ē; ei; e			ネーム nēmu "name"; ゲージ gēji "gauge"; ドレイク doreiku "drake"; エイト eito "eight"; レイフ Reifu "Ralph"; ポテト poteto "potato"; エンジェル enjeru "angel"; エンシェント enshento "ancient"; ブレザー burezā "blazer"; エプロン epuron "apron"; レディ redi, レディー redī "lady"; ベビー bebī "baby" Exceptions: オーストラリア Ōsutoraria "Australia"; カナディアン Kanadian "Canadian"; ラジオ rajio "radio"; スタジアム sutajiamu "stadium"
/f/		⟨f⟩; ⟨fe⟩; ⟨ff⟩; ⟨gh⟩; ⟨ph⟩; ⟨u⟩	f; h	f; ff	fu; ffu	ファウル fauru "foul"; フライ furai "fry", "fly"; フラワー furawā "flower"; シャッフル shaffuru "shuffle"; ラフ rafu "rough"; ヘッドホン heddohon "headphone"; レフテナント refutenanto "lieutenant"
/ɡ/		⟨g⟩; ⟨gg⟩; ⟨gh⟩; ⟨gu⟩; ⟨gue⟩	g	g; gg	gu; ggu	ガン gan "gun"; バッグ baggu "bag"; グラインダー guraindā "grinder"; グルー gurū "glue"; マグル Maguru "Muggle"; グール gūru "ghoul"; ギター gitā "guitar"
/ɡæ/		⟨ga⟩	ga; gya			ガジェット gajetto "gadget"; ギャラクシー gyarakushī "galaxy"; ギャル gyaru "gal"
/ɡz/		⟨gs⟩; ⟨ggs⟩; ⟨x⟩; ⟨xh⟩		guz; guj; kiz; kuz	guzu; gguzu	エグジット egujitto "exit"; エグゾーダス eguzōdasu "exodus"; エグザミネーション eguzaminēshon "examination"; エキゾチック ekizochikku "exotic"; エキゾースト ekizōsuto "exhaust"; バッグズ bagguzu "bags"
/ɡzjuː/	/ɡzuː/	⟨xu⟩; ⟨xhu⟩		gujū		エグジューム egujūmu "exhume"
/h/		⟨gh⟩; ⟨h⟩	h			ハンター hantā "hunter"; ハッブル Habburu "Hubble"
/huː/; /hʊ/		⟨hoo⟩; ⟨who⟩	fū, fu			フー fū "who"; フッド fuddo, フード fūdo "hood"; フック fukku, ホック hokku "hook"
/ɪ/		⟨a⟩; ⟨ae⟩; ⟨e⟩; ⟨ei⟩; ⟨i⟩; ⟨ie⟩; ⟨oe⟩	i; ī; e; ē			インプット inputto "input"; リミテッド rimiteddo "limited"; ネイキッド neikiddo "naked"; トイレット toiretto "toilet"; オレンジ orenji "orange"; ステッカー sutekkā "sticker"; デステニー desutenī "destiny"; デジタル dejitaru "digital"; アイデア aidea "idea"; メッセージ messēji "message"; ガレージ garēji "garage"; ダメージ damēji "damage"; カレッジ karejji "college"; チョコレート chokorēto "chocolate"; パレス paresu "palace"; アルティメット arutimetto "ultimate"; ネッカチーフ nekkachīfu "neckerchief"
/ɪə(ɹ)/	/ɪɹ/	⟨aer⟩; ⟨e're⟩; ⟨ear⟩; ⟨eer⟩; ⟨er⟩; ⟨ere⟩; ⟨ier⟩; ⟨ir⟩		iar; iyar; īr; ir; ear	ia; iya; īa; ea	ギア gia "gear"; ミーアキャット mīakyatto "meerkat"; イヤホン iyahon "earphone"; ヒーロー hīrō "hero"; ヒロイン hiroin "heroine"; ステアリング sutearingu "steering"
/i/		⟨e⟩; ⟨ea⟩; ⟨ee⟩; ⟨ei⟩; ⟨y⟩	i; ī; yi; ē			コミッティー komittī "committee"; ヤンキー Yankī "Yankee"; シティー shiti "city"; コメディ komedi, コメディー komedī "comedy"; アポストロフィ aposutorofi "apostrophe"; ハッピー happī, ハッピィ happyi "happy"; キャンディ kyandi, キャンディー kyandī, キャンデー kyandē "candy"
/i/		⟨ay⟩; ⟨ey⟩	ī; ē; ei; e			マリー Marī, マーレイ Mārei "Murray"; リンジー Rinjī "Lindsay"; ハービー Hābī "Harvey"; ハーレー Hārē "Harley"; ラムゼイ Ramuzei "Ramsay"; ハネムーン hanemūn, ハニームーン hanīmūn "honeymoon"
/iː/		⟨ae⟩; ⟨e⟩; ⟨ea⟩; ⟨ee⟩; ⟨i⟩; ⟨ie⟩; ⟨oe⟩	ī; ē; e			チーム chīmu "team"; グリーン gurīn "green"; ピース pīsu "piece", "peace"; タキシード takishīdo "tuxedo"; デーモン dēmon "demon"; ノルウェージャン Noruwējan "Norwegian"; ハイエナ haiena "hyena"; フェニックス fenikkusu "phoenix"
/j/		⟨y⟩	y; i			ヤング yangu "young"; ヨーク Yōku "York"; イェール Yēru "Yale"; イエロー ierō, イエロウ ierou "yellow"; イエス iesu "yes"
/ju(ː)/; /jʊ/	/ju(ː)/; /jə/	⟨eu⟩; ⟨u⟩; ⟨you⟩; ⟨yu⟩; ⟨ut⟩	yū; yu			ユー yū "you", "U"; ユニオン yunion "union"; ダブリュー daburyū "W"; サミュエル Samyueru "Samuel"; フォーミュラ fōmyura "formula"
/jʊə(ɹ)/; /jəɹ/	/jʊɹ/; /jəɹ/	⟨eu(r)⟩; ⟨u(r)⟩; ⟨you(r)⟩; ⟨you're⟩; ⟨yu(r)⟩; ⟨uh(r)⟩		yūr; yur; yuar	yua	ユーロ yūro "euro"; ユア yua "your", "you're"; マーキュリー Mākyurī "Mercury"
/k/		⟨c⟩; ⟨cc⟩; ⟨ch⟩; ⟨che⟩; ⟨ck⟩; ⟨k⟩; ⟨ke⟩; ⟨kh⟩; ⟨qu⟩; ⟨que⟩	k	k; kk	ku; kku; ki; kki	カップ kappu "cup"; キック kikku "kick"; テイク teiku "take"; ストライキ sutoraiki "strike"; ケーキ kēki "cake"; ステーキ sutēki "steak"; デッキ dekki "deck"; クラウン kuraun "clown"; サッカー sakkā "soccer", "sucker"; クロニクル kuronikuru "chronicle"
/kæ/		⟨ca⟩; ⟨cha⟩; ⟨ka⟩	ka; kya			カンザス Kanzasu "Kansas"; カメラ kamera "camera"; キャメロン Kyameron "Cameron"; キャンディー kyandī "candy"; キャプテン kyaputen "captain"
/ks/		⟨cc⟩; ⟨cs⟩; ⟨chs⟩; ⟨cks⟩; ⟨ks⟩; ⟨khs⟩; ⟨x⟩; ⟨xe⟩		kus; kkus; kis; kish	kkusu; kisu	メキシコ Mekishiko "Mexico"; テキサス Tekisasu "Texas"; テキスト tekisuto "text"; プロキシ purokishi "proxy"; タキシード takishīdo "tuxedo"; シックス shikkusu "six", "sicks"; コンプレックス konpurekkusu "complex"
/kʃ/		⟨cti⟩; ⟨xi⟩		kush		コネクション konekushon "connection", "connexion"
/kʃuəl/		⟨xual⟩		kusharu; kushuaru		バイセクシャル baisekusharu, バイセクシュアル baisekushuaru "bisexual"
/kw/		⟨cho⟩; ⟨cqu⟩; ⟨qu⟩	ku; kuw; kw; k			クオーク kuōku, クォーク kwōku "quark"; クイーン kuīn, クィーン kwīn "queen"; クワイア kuwaia "choir"; スコール sukōru "squall"; ターコイズ tākoizu "turquoise"
/l/		⟨l⟩; ⟨le⟩; ⟨ll⟩	r	r	ru	ループ rūpu "loop"; ボール bōru "ball"; ブリー burī "bully"
/m/		⟨m⟩; ⟨mb⟩; ⟨me⟩; ⟨mm⟩; ⟨mn⟩	m	m; nm	mu; n	メイ Mei "May"; サモン samon "summon"; ゲーム gēmu "game"; ランプ ranpu "lamp", "lump", "ramp", "rump"; ナンバー nanbā "number"; ガンマ ganma "gamma"; ボム bomu "bomb"; オータム ōtamu "autumn"
/n/		⟨n⟩; ⟨nd⟩; ⟨ne⟩; ⟨nn⟩	n	n; nn	n; nu	ナイン nain "nine"; ファン fan "fan"; バナナ banana "banana"; アンナ Anna "Anna"; エヌ enu "N"; カンニング kanningu "cunning"; ハンサム hansamu "handsome"; ハンカチーフ hankachīfu "handkerchief"
/nju(ː)/	/nu(ː)/	⟨new⟩; ⟨neu⟩; ⟨nu⟩	nyū			ニュー nyū "new"; ニュートロン nyūtoron "neutron"
/njʊə(ɹ)/	/nʊɹ/	⟨newr⟩; ⟨neur⟩; ⟨nur⟩; ⟨nure⟩		nyūr		ニューロン nyūron "neuron"
/ŋ/; /ŋɡ/		⟨n⟩; ⟨ng⟩		ng	n; ngu	シンガー singā "singer"; フィンガー fingā "finger"; リンク rinku "link"; リング ringu "ring"; バーミンガム Bāmingamu, バーミングハム Bāminguhamu "Birmingham"; チューインガム chūin gamu "chewing gum"; ワシントン Washinton "Washington"; ブーメラン būmeran "boomerang"
/ɔː/		⟨al⟩; ⟨au⟩; ⟨aw⟩; ⟨oa⟩; ⟨ough⟩	ō; ou; o			トーク tōku "talk"; オーストリア Ōsutoria "Austria"; クロー kurō, クロウ kurou "claw", "craw"; ストロー sutorō "straw"; ストロベリー sutoroberī "strawberry"
/ɔːl/		⟨al⟩; ⟨aul⟩; ⟨awl⟩		ōr	ōru; oru; aru	クローラー kurōrā "crawler"; オルタナティブ orutanatibu "alternative"; ワルツ warutsu "waltz"; アサルト asaruto "assault"
/ɔː(ɹ)/	/ɔːɹ/	⟨ar⟩; ⟨aur⟩; ⟨oar⟩; ⟨or⟩; ⟨our⟩; ⟨wor⟩			ō(r); oru; oa; ā	ボード bōdo "board"; コース kōsu "course"; フォー fō "four"; ストーム sutōmu "storm"; トルネード torunēdo "tornado"; ボーテックス bōtekkusu, ボルテックス borutekkusu "vortex"; ノルウェー Noruwē "Norway"; ウォー wō "war"; オア oa "or", "oar"; ダイナソー dainasō, ダイノソー dainosō "dinosaur"; コーラス kōrasu "chorus"; ソード sōdo "sword"; ワープ wāpu "warp"; ホグワーツ Hoguwātsu "Hogwarts"
/ɔː(ɹ)/	/ɔːɹ/	⟨oor⟩; ⟨ore⟩			oa	コア koa "core"; フォア foa "fore"; ドア doa "door"; フロア furoa "floor"
/ɔɪ/		⟨eu⟩; ⟨oi⟩; ⟨oy⟩	oi			コイン koin "coin"; トイ toi "toy" Exception: ボーイ bōi "boy"
/ɔɪə(ɹ)/		⟨awyer⟩	oiyā			ロイヤー roiyā "lawyer"
/ɔɪəl/		⟨oyal⟩	oiyaru			ロイヤル roiyaru "royal", "loyal"
/p/		⟨p⟩; ⟨pe⟩; ⟨ph⟩; ⟨pp⟩	p	p; pp	pu; ppu	パック pakku "pack"; トップ toppu "top"; プランクトン purankuton "plankton"; プルーフ purūfu "proof"
/ɹ/; /(ɹ)/	/ɹ/	⟨lo⟩; ⟨r⟩; ⟨re⟩; ⟨rh⟩; ⟨rps⟩; ⟨rr⟩; ⟨rt⟩	r	r	omitted; ru	ラム ramu "ram", "RAM", "rum"; テリー Terī "Terry"; リズム rizumu "rhythm"; バー bā "bar"; カリフォルニア Kariforunia "California"; アール āru "R", "are"
/ˌɹiːˌɪ/		⟨rei⟩	rii; ryi; ri			リインカーネーション riinkānēshon, リィンカーネーション ryinkānēshon, リンカーネーション rinkānēshon, リンカーネイション rinkāneishon, リンカネーション rinkanēshon "reincarnation"
/s/		⟨'s⟩; ⟨c⟩; ⟨ce⟩; ⟨s⟩; ⟨s'⟩; ⟨sc⟩; ⟨se⟩; ⟨ss⟩; ⟨st⟩; ⟨sw⟩	s; sh	s; ss; sh; ssh	su; ssu	サンド sando "sand"; シンク shinku "sink", "cinque"; メッセンジャー messenjā "messenger"; ケーシング kēshingu "casing"; キス kisu, キッス kissu "kiss"; キャッスル kyassuru "castle"; ストップ sutoppu "stop"; スラッシュ surasshu "slash"; セント sento "cent"; マッスル massuru "muscle"; クリスマス Kurisumasu "Christmas"; Exception: シチュー shichū "stew"
/sjuː/	/suː/	⟨su⟩	shū			コンシューマー konshūmā "consumer"
/ʃ/		⟨ch⟩; ⟨che⟩; ⟨ci⟩; ⟨s⟩; ⟨sc⟩; ⟨sch⟩; ⟨sh⟩; ⟨si⟩; ⟨sti⟩; ⟨ti⟩	sh	sh; ssh	shu; sshu	シップ shippu "ship"; クラッシャー kurasshā "crusher"; フラッシュ furasshu "flash", "flush"; シュラウド shuraudo "shroud"; ディメンション dimenshon "dimension"; アクション akushon "action"; イグニッション igunisshon "ignition"; スペシャル supesharu "special"
/ʃuəl/		⟨sual⟩	sharu; shuaru			コンセンシャル konsensharu "consensual"
/t/		⟨bt⟩; ⟨ct⟩; ⟨pt⟩; ⟨t⟩; ⟨te⟩; ⟨th⟩; ⟨tt⟩; ⟨tte⟩	t; ch; ts	t; tt; ts	to; tto; tsu; ttsu; do	テープ tēpu "tape"; インフィニティ infiniti "infinity"; チップ chippu "tip"; チーム chīmu "team"; スチーム suchīmu "steam"; チケット chiketto, ティケット tiketto, テケツ teketsu "ticket"; ツアー tsuā "tour"; ツー tsū, トゥー tū "two", "to"; タイタン Taitan "Titan"; スケート sukēto "skate"; ヒッティング hittingu "hitting"; カートゥーン kātūn "cartoon"; キャット kyatto, キャッツ kyattsu "cat"; シャツ shatsu "shirt"; ピーナッツ pīnattsu, ピーナツ pīnatsu, ピーナット pīnatto "peanut"; フルーツ furūtsu "fruit"; スーツ sūtsu, スート sūto "suit"; トランプ torampu "trump"; バトル batoru "battle"; テムズ Temuzu, テームズ Tēmuzu "Thames"; コネチカット Konechikatto "Connecticut"; アドバンスト adobansuto, アドバンスド adobansudo "advanced"
/tjuː/	/tuː/	⟨tew⟩; ⟨tu⟩; ⟨tue⟩	chū; chuw; tyū			チューナー chūnā "tuner"; チューバ chūba, テューバ tyūba "tuba"; スチュワード suchuwādo "steward"; チューズデー Chūzudē "Tuesday"
/ts/		⟨t's⟩; ⟨ts⟩; ⟨tts⟩			tsu; ttsu	キャッツ kyattsu "cats"; イッツ ittsu "it's", "its"
/tʃ/		⟨ch⟩; ⟨tch⟩	ch	ch; tch	chi; tchi	チキン chikin, チケン chiken, チッケン chikken "chicken"; キチン kichin, キッチン kitchin, キッチェン kitchen "kitchen"; マッチ matchi "match"
/tʃʊə(ɹ)/	/tʃʊɹ/	⟨ture⟩		chua		マチュア machua "mature"
/tʃuəl/		⟨tual⟩			charu; chuaru	バーチャル bācharu, バーチュアル bāchuaru "virtual"
/θ/		⟨th⟩; ⟨the⟩	s; sh	s; ss; sh; ssh; j	su; ssu	ソー Sō "Thor"; シーフ shīfu "thief"; バスルーム basurūmu "bathroom"; スレッド sureddo "thread"; ゴッサム Gossamu "Gotham"; アメシスト ameshisuto, アメジスト amejisuto "amethyst"
/ʊ/		⟨oo⟩; ⟨u⟩	u			ブック bukku "book"; ブル buru "bull"
/ʊə(ɹ)/; /ɔː(ɹ)/	/ʊɹ/	⟨oor⟩; ⟨our⟩; ⟨ure⟩		uar; ūr	ua; ūa; uā	ムーア mūa "moor"; シュア shua "sure"; ツアー tsuā "tour"; ツーリスト tsūrisuto "tourist"; ミズーリ Mizūri "Missouri"
/u(ː)/		⟨ew⟩; ⟨o⟩; ⟨oe⟩; ⟨oo⟩; ⟨ou⟩; ⟨ough⟩; ⟨ue⟩; ⟨ui⟩	ū; u; yū			ドゥー dū "do"; コクーン kokūn "cocoon"; シュー shū "shoe"; スープ sūpu "soup"; スルー surū "through"; ブルーマー burūmā, ブルマー burumā "bloomer"; ジュース jūsu "juice"; ブイ bui "buoy"; クルー kurū "crew"; コークスクリュー kōkusukuryū "corkscrew"; アンドリュー Andoryū "Andrew"; Exceptions: ドリトル Doritoru "Dolittle"; スタジオ sutajio "studio"; アコースティック akōsutikku "acoustic"
/v/		⟨ph⟩; ⟨v⟩; ⟨ve⟩; ⟨w⟩	b; v	b; v	bu; vu	バイキング Baikingu, ヴァイキング Vaikingu "Viking"; ラブ rabu, ラヴ ravu "love"; スティーヴン Sutīvun "Stephen"
/ʌ/		⟨o⟩; ⟨oo⟩; ⟨ou⟩; ⟨u⟩	a; o			マフィン mafin, マッフィン maffin "muffin"; ブラッド buraddo "blood"; プラス purasu "plus"; カミング kamingu "coming"; マンスリー mansurī "monthly"; パンチ panchi, ポンチ ponchi "punch"; コロンビア Koronbia "Columbia"; トンネル tonneru "tunnel"; フロント furonto "front"; モンク monku "monk"; モンキー monkī "monkey"; ロンドン Rondon "London"
/w/		⟨w⟩; ⟨ou⟩	u; w; omitted	u; w		グウェン Guwen "Gwen"; スウェーデン Suwēden "Sweden"; ウォーム wōmu "warm"; ワーム wāmu "worm"; ツイン tsuin "twin"; ジャガー jagā "jaguar"; ペンギン pengin "penguin"; ティンクル tinkuru "twinkle"; サンドイッチ sandoitchi, サンドウィッチ sandowitchi "sandwich"; セーター sētā "sweater"; アウェイクン aweikun, アウエイクン aueikun "awaken"
/w/		⟨wh⟩	how; ho; u; w			ホワイト howaito "white"; ホワッツ howattsu "what's"; ホエール hoēru "whale"; ホイール hoīru "wheel"; ホイップ hoippu, ウイップ uippu, ウィップ wippu "whip"; ウィート wīto "wheat"
/wʊ/		⟨wo⟩; ⟨woo⟩	u; ū			ウッド uddo "wood"; ウーマン ūman "woman"
/z/		⟨'s⟩; ⟨s⟩; ⟨sc⟩; ⟨se⟩; ⟨ss⟩; ⟨z⟩; ⟨ze⟩; ⟨zz⟩	z; j	z; zz; j; jj	zu; zzu; su	ズーム zūmu "zoom"; ジッパー jippā "zipper"; ライジング raijingu "rising"; クレージ kurējī "crazy"; フェイズ feizu "phase"; パズル pazuru "puzzle"; ディジー dijī, ディズィー dizī "dizzy"; ポゼッション pozesshon "possession"; ミズーリ Mizūri "Missouri"; ニュース nyūsu "news"; ブルース burūsu "blues"; フェアリーズ fearīzu, フェアリース fearīsu "fairies"; ゼット zetto, ズィ zi "Z"
/ʒ/		⟨g⟩; ⟨ge⟩; ⟨si⟩; ⟨ti⟩; ⟨zi⟩		j		テレビジョン terebijon "television"; イクエージョン ikuējon "equation"; ブレージャーburējā "brazier"
/ʒuəl/		⟨sual⟩		juaru		ビジュアル bijuaru "visual"

== See also ==
- Romanization of Japanese
- Transcription into Korean

== Bibliography ==
- Irwin, Mark (2011), Loanwords in Japanese, John Benjamins, ISBN 978-90-2720592-6
