= Transcription of the Japanese language in Esperanto =

Esperantists often use non-Esperanto transcriptions, such as Hepburn and Kunrei, to transcribe the Japanese language in the Esperanto alphabet. However, the need for a transcription in the Esperanto alphabet is essential for non-Japanese speaking Esperantists to be able to pronounce words.

== Summary ==
There are two well-known transcription systems of Japanese in Latin alphabet: Hepburn and Kunrei. However, there is no official Esperanto transcription for Japanese. This page presents one of the unofficial methods of transcription.

== Transcription ==
Most books on Esperanto published in Japan provide tables for transcription. In 2012, a book by Kenichi Fujimaki, called Revised Esperanto Grammar (まるごとエスペラント文法 改訂版) explains one way of transcription, however, as far as 1923, Yoshimi Ishiguro writes his Beginning Esperanto Textbook (初等エスペラント教科書) explaining a transcription, however the remaining digital copies of his works are barely readable, so they are not included in this article.

=== Double consonant ===
The symbol "っ" / "ッ" is not actually transcribed, but instead, indicated by doubling the following consonant. For example, さっぽろ is transcribed as "Sapporo".

According to Hepburn:

- c → tc (ts → tts)
- ĉ → tĉ (ch → tch)
- ŝ → sŝ (sh → ssh)

According to Kunrei:

- c → cc (t → tt)
- ĉ → ĉĉ (ty → tty)
- ŝ → ŝŝ (sy → ssy)

=== Long vowels ===
These are various methods of transcribing the word Tokyo (とうきょう, kanji: 東京):

- Tōkjō : Indicated by a macron.
- Tokjo : No indication.
- Tôkjô : Indicated by a circumflex.
- Toukjou or Toŭkjoŭ: Indicated by the use of an ou for a long o sound, and a ŭ for a long u sound.
- Tookjoo: Indicated by doubling the vowels.

=== Diphthongs ===
The Japanese vowel i is changed to j and the vowel u is changed to ŭ for Esperanto transcription.

- ai → aj
- ei → ej
- oi → oj
- ui → uj
- au → aŭ
- eu → eŭ
- ou → oŭ
- ue → ŭe

=== Consonants ===
If there is a じ (ji) before an ん (n) in a word, it must be written as ĝi. Otherwise, either ĵi or ĝi can be used.

- "Ĝiŝin" (じしん, 地震, earthquakes)
- "Buridĝi" (ブリッジ, contract bridge)
- "Kanĝi" (かんじ, 漢字, kanji)
- "Fuĵi-san" (ふじさん, 富士山, Fuji, Note: さん is a separate word, ĵ can be used)

When the syllable ず/づ is used at the beginning of a word, it is mostly transcribed as dzu, directly from Hepburn; but if the syllable is anywhere else in the word, it is mostly transcribed as zu.

- Kazu (かず, number)
- Manazuru (まなづる)
- Dzuke (づけ)
- Dzumen (ずめん, drawing)

=== Voiceless vowels ===
Generally, some vowels may not be said at all. This is very common in everyday speech in Japanese

- Shita → Ŝta (した)
- Desu → Des (です)

== Romanization charts ==
あ ア a	い イ i	う ウ u	え エ e	お オ o	や ヤ ja	ユ ゆ ju	よ ヨ jo
か カ ka	き キ ki	く ク ku	け ケ ke	こ コ ko	きゃ キャ kja	きゅ キュ kju	きょ キョ kjo
さ サ sa	し シ ŝi	す ス su	せ セ se	そ ソ so	しゃ シャ ŝa	しゅ シュ ŝu	しょ ショ ŝo
た タ ta	ち チ ĉi	つ ツ cu	て テ te	と ト to	ちゃ チャ ĉa	ちゅ チュ ĉu	ちょ チョ ĉo
な ナ na	に ニ ni	ぬ ヌ nu	ね ネ ne	の ノ no	にゃ ニャ nja	にゅ ニュ nju	にょ ニョ njo
は ハ ha	ひ ヒ hi	ふ フ fu	へ ヘ he	ほ ホ ho	ひゃ ヒャ hja	ひゅ ヒュ hju	ひょ ヒョ hjo
ま マ ma	み ミ mi	む ム mu	め メ me	も モ mo	みゃ ミャ mja	みゅ ミュ mju	みょ ミョ mjo
ら ラ ra	り リ ri	る ル ru	れ レ re	ろ ロ ro	りゃ リャ rja	りゅ リュ rju	りょ リョ rjo
わ ワ ŭa	ゐ ヰ ŭi		ゑ ヱ ŭe	を ヲ ŭo			
				ん ン n			
が ガ ga	ぎ ギ gi	ぐ グ gu	げ ゲ ge	ご ゴ go	ぎゃ ギャ gja	ぎゅ ギュ gju	ぎょ ギョ gjo
ざ ザ za	じ ジ ĝi / ĵi	ず ズ zu / dzu	ぜ ゼ ze	ぞ ゾ zo	じゃ ジャ ĝa / ĵa	じゅ ジュ ĝu / ĵu	じょ ジョ ĝo / ĵo
だ ダ da	ぢ ヂ (ĝi) / (ĵi)	づ ヅ (zu) / (dzu)	で デ de	ど ド do	ぢゃ ヂャ (ĝa) / (ĵa)	ぢゅ ヂュ (ĝu) / (ĵu)	ぢょ ヂョ (ĝo) / (ĵo)
ば バ ba	び ビ bi	ぶ ブ bu	べ ベ be	ぼ ボ bo	びゃ ビャ bja	びゅ ビュ bju	びょ ビョ bjo
ぱ パ pa	ぴ ピ pi	ぷ プ pu	ぺ ペ pe	ぽ ポ po	ぴゃ ピャ pja	ぴゅ ピュ pju	ぴょ ピョ pjo

			イェ je	
	ウィ ŭi		ウェ ŭe	ウォ ŭo
ヴァ va	ヴィ vi	ヴ vu	ヴェ ve	ヴォ vo
			シェ ŝe	
			ジェ ĝe / ĵe	
			チェ ĉe	
	ティ ti	トゥ tu		
		テュ tju		
	ディ di	ドゥ du		
		デュ dju		
ツァ ca	ツィ ci		ツェ ce	ツォ co
ファ fa	フィ fi		フェ fe	フォ fo
		フュ fju		

- Red letters indicate Kana no longer used in modern Japanese.

== See also ==
- Esperantigo de vortoj el japana fonto
- Romanization of Japanese
  - Hepburn romanization
  - Kunrei-shiki romanization
