= Transcription into Korean =

Mapping of foreign sounds into Korean

Foreign words when used in Korean undergo transcription, to make them pronounceable and memorable. Transcription into Korean, for the most part, is very similar to or even influenced by transcription into Japanese, although the number of homophones resulted by imperfect mapping of foreign sounds onto native sounds is significantly smaller, as Korean has a larger phoneme inventory and a more inclusive phonotactics.

== Practicalities of transcription ==
The typical syllable structure of Korean is CGVC, with C being "consonant", G "glide", and V "vowel". Consonants and glides are optional. A few English words may get irregular transcription treatment, likely due to the influence of Japanese. Eg: shirt → 샤츠 sya-cheu (Japanese シャツ sha-tsu); mother → 마더 ma-deo (Japanese マザー ma-za-a); dragon → 드래곤 deu-rae-gon (Japanese ドラゴン do-ra-gon); level → 레벨 re-bel (Japanese レベル re-be-ru).

For the most part, transcription into Korean is phonemic, i.e., based on the phonologies of both the source and the target languages (Korean itself). However, [l], an allophone of /r/ in Korean, is utilized syllable-finally and intervocalically to transcribe the foreign sound /l/. This makes the foreign sound /l/ more transcribable into Korean than it is into Japanese, which has no strategic differences between [l] and /r/. E.g.: ball → 볼 bol (Japanese ボール bo-o-ru); gallon → 갤런 gal-leon (Japanese ガロン ga-ron). Note that [l] is always geminated intervocallically in transcriptions. E.g.: Hellen → 헬렌 Hel-len. Syllable-initially, the foreign liquid sounds /r/ and /l/ are rendered as /r/. E.g.: right and light → 라이트 ra-i-teu (Japanese ライト ra-i-to)

Consonants and vowels are transcribed to the native ones that approximate them the most, because, of course, Korean does not have all the sounds of all languages, nor has it developed any new sounds due to recent linguistic contact like Japanese with new sounds like /f/ or even /v/. E.g.: father → 파더 pa-deo (Japanese ファザー fa-za-a). Particularly, transcription into Korean tend to be more conservative as it only employs available hangul syllables, rather than establishing new, non-native combinations like Japanese. For example, the English word "warrior" is transcribed into Korean as 워리어 wo-ri-eo using 워, a pre-existing syllable composed of ᅮ u and ᅥ eo, rather than with a combination of u and o; in contrast, it is transcribed into Japanese as ウォリアー wo-ri-a-a, using ウォ, a non-native combination. On another note, the foreign phoneme /v/ is always transcribed as ᆸ b(eu) (native) into Korean, but as either b(u) (native) or v(u) (non-native) into Japanese.

=== Consonants ===
Like Japanese, Korean does not allow any consonant clusters other than CG, therefore, when foreign words with such clusters are transcribed, the clusters are broken down and distributed among several syllables. For example, the English word brand is transcribed into Korean as 브랜드 beu-raen-deu (compare Japanese ブランド bu-ra-n-do), wherein the sequence bran is broken down into two syllables, beu-raen. In these cases, a vowel ㅡ eu is inserted in between the consonants of the cluster (compare Japanese u, o).

Korean has seven consonants that can occur at the end of a syllable and that are used in transcriptions. Those are /p/, /t/, /k/, /r/, /m/, /n/ and /ŋ/. /p/, /t/ and /k/ generally represent foreign voiceless consonants, although /p/ and /k/ (rendered using jamo ㅂ and ㄱ) occasionally denote voiced consonants, too. E.g.: lab and lap → 랩 raep; deck → 덱 dek. Foreign /t/ is variously rendered as ㅅ or 트 teu. E.g.: secret → 시크릿 si-keu-rit; set → 세트 se-teu. Foreign /p/, /t/, /k/ are rendered using jamo ㅂ, ㅅ, ㄱ if the preceding foreign vowel is short, but generally using 프 peu, 트 teu, 크 keu if that vowel is long or a diphthong. E.g.: map → 맵 maep (Japanese マップ ma-p-pu), but mark → 마크 ma-keu (Japanese マーク ma-a-ku) and type → 타이프 ta-i-peu (but also 타입 ta-ip) (Japanese タイプ ta-i-pu). Foreign /l/, /m/, /n/, /ŋ/ are always rendered using jamo ㄹ, ㅁ, ㄴ, ㅇ, regardless of the quality of the preceding vowel. E.g.: Tom → 톰 Tom; time → 타임 ta-im.

Syllable-finally, foreign consonants not covered by the seven sounds above are transcribed as Cㅡ Ceu (C for "consonant"). E.g.: dead → 데드 de-deu (Japanese デッド de-d-do); speed → 스피드 seu-pi-deu (Japanese スピード su-pi-i-do); five → 파이브 pa-i-beu (Japanese ファイブ fa-i-bu); life → 라이프 ra-i-peu (Japanese ライフ ra-i-fu).

=== Vowels ===
Also, like Japanese, modern Korean lacks diphthongs (ancient diphthongs have all developed into monophthongs). Likewise, foreign diphthongs are broken down and distributed among two syllables. For example, English eye is transcribed into Korean as 아이 a-i (compare Japanese アイ a-i), wherein the diphthong /aɪ/ is rendered as a-i.

Korean has a larger phoneme inventory than Japanese, which allows broader coverage when transcribing foreign sounds. Whereas Japanese uses a single "a" sound for various English sounds such as /æ/, /ɑː/, /ə/, /ʌ/, Korean uses ㅐ ae for /æ/, ㅏ a for /ɑː/, ㅓ eo for /ə/ and /ʌ/. E.g.: hand → 핸드 haen-deu; card → 카드 ka-deu; hunter → 헌터 heon-teo. Occasionally, however, the choice of sounds for transcription is influenced by Japanese. E.g.: brother → 브라더 beu-ra-deo (Japanese ブラザー bu-ra-za-a); dragon → 드래곤 deuraegon (Japanese ドラゴン do-ra-go-n).

Like Japanese, transcription from English into Korean is largely based on Received Pronunciation (non-rhotic). However, while Japanese still denotes English vowels like /ɑː/ in car, /ɔː/ in course, /ə/ in monster as lengthened vowels (a-a, o-o, a-a respectively), Korean ignores vowel length almost entirely, although such length is still indirectly denoted in some cases mentioned above with the use of 프 peu, 트 teu, 크 keu. E.g.: car → 카 ka (Japanese カー ka-a); card → 카드 ka-deu (Japanese カード ka-a-do); course → 코스 ko-seu (Japanese コース ko-o-su); monster → 몬스터 mon-seu-teo (Japanese モンスター mo-n-su-ta-a).

== Table of transcription from English ==
English phonemes		Common English graphemes	Korean transcription jamo with Revised Romanization in italics			Examples
Received Pronunciation	General American	Common English graphemes	If the English consonant is prevocalic and not postvocalic	If the English consonant is intervocalic	If the English consonant is not prevocalic	Examples
/æ/		⟨a⟩; ⟨ae⟩; ⟨al⟩; ⟨au⟩	ㅐ ae; ㅏ a			핸드 haendeu "hand"; 양키 Yangki "Yankee"
/ɒ/	/ɑː/; /ɔː/	⟨a⟩; ⟨ach⟩; ⟨au⟩; ⟨o⟩; ⟨ou⟩	ㅗ o; ㅏ a			톰 Tom "Tom"; 톱 top, 탑 tap "top"; 복스 bokseu, 박스 bakseu "box"
/ɑː/	/æ/; /ɑː/	⟨a⟩; ⟨al⟩; ⟨au⟩	ㅏ a			하프 hapeu "half"; 파더 padeo "father"
/ɑː(ɹ)/	/ɑːɹ/	⟨ar⟩; ⟨ear⟩; ⟨er⟩		ㅏㄹ ar	ㅏ a	카드 kadeu "card"
/aɪ/		⟨ai⟩; ⟨ei⟩; ⟨eigh⟩; ⟨i⟩; ⟨ic⟩; ⟨ie⟩; ⟨igh⟩; ⟨is⟩; ⟨oy⟩; ⟨uy⟩; ⟨y⟩; ⟨ye⟩	ㅏ이 ai			다이스 daiseu "dice"; 타임 taim "time"
/aɪə(ɹ)/	/aɪɚ/; /aɪ/	⟨ia(r)⟩; ⟨igher⟩; ⟨ire⟩; ⟨iro⟩		ㅏ이어ㄹ aieor	ㅏ이어 aieo; ㅏ이아 aia	파이어 paieo "fire"; 다이어리 daieori "diary"; 다이아몬드 daiamondeu "diamond"
/aɪl/	/l/	⟨ile⟩			ㅏ일 ail	미사일 misail "missile"
/aʊ/		⟨au⟩; ⟨ou⟩; ⟨ough⟩; ⟨ow⟩	ㅏ우 au			타운 taun "town"
/aʊə(ɹ)/	/aʊɚ/	⟨our⟩; ⟨ower⟩		ㅏ워ㄹ awor	ㅏ워 awo	파워 pawo "power"
/b/		⟨b⟩; ⟨bb⟩; ⟨be⟩; ⟨pb⟩	ㅂ b		ㅂ p; 브 beu	벤치 benchi "bench"; 래빗 raebit "rabbit"; 브레이크 beureikeu "brake"; 랩 raep "lab"; 태브 taebeu "tab"; 테이블 teibeul "table"
/d/		⟨d⟩; ⟨dd⟩; ⟨de⟩	ㄷ d		드 deu	도어 do-eo; 페이딩 peiding "fading"; 드레이크 deureikeu "drake"; 베드 bedeu "bed"; 미들 mideul "middle"
/djuː/	/duː/	⟨dew⟩; ⟨du⟩; ⟨due⟩	듀 dyu			듀얼 dyueol "dual", "duel"; 듀 dyu "dew", "due"
/dz/		⟨ds⟩; ⟨dds⟩			즈 jeu	에이즈 eijeu "AIDS"
/dʒ/		⟨di⟩; ⟨dg⟩; ⟨dge⟩; ⟨g⟩; ⟨ge⟩; ⟨j⟩	ㅈ j	ㅈ j	지 ji	점프 jeompeu "jump"; 버짓 beojit "budget"; 솔저 soljeo "soldier"; 에지 eji "edge"; 에인절 einjeol "angel"
/ð/		⟨th⟩; ⟨the⟩	ㄷ d		드 deu	더 deo, 디 di "the"; 마더 madeo "mother"; 알고리듬 algorideum "algorithm"
/ɛ/		⟨e⟩; ⟨ea⟩; ⟨ie⟩; ⟨oe⟩	ㅔ e			엔드 endeu "end"; 프렌드 peurendeu "friend"
/ɛə(ɹ)/	/ɛɹ/	⟨ar⟩; ⟨aer⟩; ⟨air⟩; ⟨are⟩; ⟨ear⟩; ⟨eir⟩; ⟨ere⟩; ⟨ey're⟩		ㅔ어ㄹ eeor	ㅔ어 eeo	에어 eeo "air"; 에어리어 eeorieo "area"
/ə/		⟨a⟩	ㅓ eo; ㅏ a; ㅐ ae			멀리건 meolligeon "mulligan"; 고섬 Goseom "Gotham"; 어바우트 eobauteu "about"; 에어리어 eeorieo "area"; 아칸소 Akanso "Arkansas"; 오스트레일리아 Oseuteureillia "Australia"; 크리스마스 Keuriseumaseu "Christmas"; 잉글랜드 Inggeullaendeu "England"
/ə/		⟨e⟩; ⟨gh⟩; ⟨ou⟩; ⟨ough⟩; ⟨u⟩	ㅓ eo			테스타먼트 teseutameonteu "testament"; 세일럼 Seilleom "Salem"; 서러 seoreo "thorough"; 에든버러 Edinbeoreo "Edinburgh"; 앨범 aelbeom "album"; 바이러스 baireoseu "virus"; 앨버커키 Albeokeoki "Albuquerque"; 뉴펀들랜드 Nyupeondeullaendeu "Newfoundland"
/ə/		⟨o⟩	ㅓ eo; ㅗ o			커먼 keomeon "common"; 세컨드 sekeondeu "second"; 다이너소어 daineosoeo "dinosaur"; 킹덤 kingdeom "kingdom"; 오브 obeu; 포테이토 poteito "potato"; 스켈레톤 seukelleton "skeleton"; 드래곤 deuraegon "dragon"
/ə(ɹ)/	/ɚ/	⟨ar⟩; ⟨er⟩; ⟨or⟩; ⟨our⟩; ⟨ure⟩		ㅓㄹ eor	ㅓ eo; ㅓ르 eoreu	컴퓨터 kompyuteo "computer"; 컬러 keolleo "color"; 커서 keoseo "cursor"; 멜버른 Melbeoreun "Melbourne"
/əl/; /l/		⟨ael⟩; ⟨al⟩; ⟨el⟩; ⟨le⟩			eol; eul; el	스페셜 seupesyeol "special"; 패널 paeneol "panel"; 머슬 meoseul "muscle"; 사이클 saikeul "cycle"; 배틀 baeteul "battle"; 스테이플 seuteipeul "staple"; 퍼즐 peojeul "puzzle"; 마이클 Maikeul "Michael"; 레벨 rebel "level", "revel", "rebel"
/ən/; /n/		⟨ain⟩			in; eun	마운틴 mauntin; 브리튼 Beuriteun "Britain"
/ən/; /n/		⟨en⟩			eun; in	하이픈 haipeun "hyphen"; 세븐 sebeun "seven"; 토큰 tokeun "token"; 서든 seodeon "sudden"; 시즌 sijeun; 치킨 chikin "chicken"; 키친 kichin "kitchen"
/əʊ/	/oʊ/	⟨au⟩; ⟨eau⟩; ⟨eaux⟩; ⟨o⟩; ⟨oa⟩; ⟨oe⟩; ⟨oh⟩; ⟨ough⟩; ⟨ow⟩; ⟨owe⟩	ㅗ o; ㅗ우 ou			쇼 syo "show"; 포니 poni; 오하이오 Ohaio "Ohio"; 솔 sol, 소울 soul "soul"
/ɜː(ɹ)/	/ɜːɹ/	⟨ear⟩; ⟨er⟩; ⟨ir⟩; ⟨olo⟩; ⟨ur⟩		ㅓㄹ eor	ㅓ eo	어스 eoseu "earth"; 웜 wom "worm"; 퍼리 peori "furry"
/eɪ/		⟨a⟩; ⟨ae⟩; ⟨ai⟩; ⟨ait⟩; ⟨al⟩; ⟨au⟩; ⟨ay⟩; ⟨e⟩; ⟨ei⟩; ⟨eigh⟩; ⟨et⟩; ⟨ey⟩	ㅔ이 ei			게임 geim "game"
/f/		⟨f⟩; ⟨fe⟩; ⟨ff⟩; ⟨gh⟩; ⟨ph⟩; ⟨u⟩	ㅍ p		프 peu	파울 paul "foul"; 이펙트 ipekteu "effect"; 러프 reopeu "rough"; 러플 reopeul "ruffle"; 플릭 peullik "flick"; 피시 pisi "fish" Exception: 휘시 huisi "fish"
/ɡ/		⟨g⟩; ⟨gg⟩; ⟨gh⟩; ⟨gu⟩; ⟨gue⟩	ㄱ g		ㄱ k; 그 geu	건 geon "gun"; 백 baek "bag"; 버그 beogeu "bug"; 이글 igeul "eagle"; 글라스 geullaseu "glass"
/ɡz/		⟨gs⟩; ⟨ggs⟩; ⟨x⟩; ⟨xh⟩		그ㅈ geuj	그스 geuseu	이그잼 igeujaem "exam"; 이그조스트 igeujoseuteu "exhaust"; 에그스 egeuseu "eggs"
/h/		⟨gh⟩; ⟨h⟩; ⟨wh⟩	ㅎ h			헌터 heonteo "hunter"
/ɪ/		⟨a⟩; ⟨ae⟩; ⟨e⟩; ⟨ei⟩; ⟨i⟩; ⟨ie⟩; ⟨oe⟩	ㅣ i; ㅔ e			인풋 input "input"; 메시지 mesiji "message"; 쵸콜레트 chyokolleteu "chocolate"; 스켈레톤 seukelleton "skeleton"
/ɪə(ɹ)/	/ɪɹ/	⟨aer⟩; ⟨e're⟩; ⟨ear⟩; ⟨eer⟩; ⟨er⟩; ⟨ere⟩; ⟨ier⟩; ⟨ir⟩		ㅣ어ㄹ ieor	ㅣ어 ieo	기어 gieo "gear"; 히어로 hieoro "hero"
/i/		⟨ay⟩; ⟨e⟩; ⟨ea⟩; ⟨ee⟩; ⟨ey⟩; ⟨i⟩; ⟨y⟩	ㅣ i			시티 siti "city"; 양키 Yangki "Yankee"; 허니 heoni "honey"
/iː/		⟨ae⟩; ⟨e⟩; ⟨ea⟩; ⟨ee⟩; ⟨i⟩; ⟨ie⟩; ⟨oe⟩	ㅣ i; ㅔ e			팀 tim "team"; 하이에나 haiena "hyena"
/j/		⟨y⟩	y			옐로 yello "yellow"
/ju(ː)/; /jʊ/	/ju(ː)/; /jə/	⟨eu⟩; ⟨u⟩; ⟨you⟩; ⟨yu⟩; ⟨ut⟩	유 yu			유니언 yunieon "union"; 더블유 deobeuryu "W"; 새뮤얼 Samyueol "Samuel"
/jʊə(ɹ)/; /jəɹ/	/jʊɹ/; /jəɹ/	⟨eu(r)⟩; ⟨u(r)⟩; ⟨you(r)⟩; ⟨you're⟩; ⟨yu(r)⟩; ⟨uh(r)⟩		유ㄹ yur; 유어ㄹ yueor	유어 yueo	유럽 Yureop "Europe"; 유어 yueo "your", "you're"; 머큐리 Meokyuri "Mercury"
/k/		⟨c⟩; ⟨cc⟩; ⟨ch⟩; ⟨che⟩; ⟨ck⟩; ⟨k⟩; ⟨ke⟩; ⟨kh⟩; ⟨qu⟩; ⟨que⟩	ㅋ k		ㄱ k; 크 keu	킥 kik "kick"; 스파이크 seupaikeu "spike"; 크로니클 keuronikeul "chronicle"
/ks/		⟨cc⟩; ⟨cs⟩; ⟨chs⟩; ⟨cks⟩; ⟨ks⟩; ⟨khs⟩; ⟨x⟩; ⟨xe⟩		ㄱㅅ ks	ㄱ스 kseu	멕시코 Meksiko "Mexico"; 콤플렉스 kompeullekseu "complex"
/kʃ/		⟨cti⟩; ⟨xi⟩		ksy		커넥션 keoneksyeon "connection", "connexion"
/kʃuəl/		⟨xual⟩		ksyueol		섹슈얼 seksyueol "sexual"
/kw/		⟨cqu⟩; ⟨qu⟩	kw			퀸 kwin "queen"
/kwɔː(ɹ)/	/kwɔːɹ/	⟨quar⟩	쿼 kwo			쿼크 kwokeu "quark"
/l/		⟨l⟩; ⟨le⟩; ⟨ll⟩	ㄹ r; ㄹㄹ ll	ㄹㄹ ll	ㄹ l	루프 rupeu "loop"; 밸런스 baelleonseu "balance"; 세일 seil "sale", "sail"; 블랙 beullaek "black"; 걸 geol "girl"; 캐슬 kaeseul "castle"
/m/		⟨m⟩; ⟨mb⟩; ⟨me⟩; ⟨mm⟩; ⟨mn⟩	ㅁ m	ㅁㅁ mm	ㅁ m	마임 maim "mime"; 서몬 seomon "summon"; 감마 gamma "gamma"
/n/		⟨n⟩; ⟨nd⟩; ⟨ne⟩; ⟨nn⟩	ㄴ n			나인 nain "nine"; 베넷 Benet "Bennett"
/njuː/; /njʊə(ɹ)/	/nuː/; /nʊɹ/	⟨new(r)⟩; ⟨neur⟩; ⟨nu(r)⟩; ⟨nure⟩	뉴(ㄹ) nyu(r)			뉴 nyu "new"; 뉴런 nyureon "neuron"
/ŋ/		⟨n⟩; ⟨ng⟩		ㅇ ng		싱어 sing-eo "singer"; 핑거 pinggeo "finger"; 킹 king "king"; 랭크 raengkeu "rank"
/ɔː/		⟨al⟩; ⟨au⟩; ⟨aw⟩; ⟨oa⟩; ⟨ough⟩	ㅗ o; ㅗ우 ou			토크 tokeu "talk"; 오스트리아 Oseuteuria "Austria"; 드로우 deurou "draw"
/ɔːl/		⟨al⟩; ⟨aul⟩; ⟨awl⟩		oll	ol	올터너티브 olteoneotibeu "alternative" Exceptions: 왈츠 walcheu "waltz"; 어썰트 eosseolteu "assault"
/ɔː(ɹ)/	/ɔːɹ/	⟨ar⟩; ⟨aur⟩; ⟨oar⟩; ⟨or⟩; ⟨our⟩; ⟨wor⟩			ㅗ o; ㅗ어 o-eo; ㅗ르 oreu; ㅏ a	포 po "four"; 오어 o-eo "or"; 노르웨이 Noreuwei "Norway"; 호그와트 Hogeuwateu
/ɔː(ɹ)/	/ɔːɹ/	⟨oor⟩; ⟨ore⟩			ㅗ어 o-eo	코어 ko-eo "core"; 도어 do-eo "door"
/ɔɪ/		⟨eu⟩; ⟨oi⟩; ⟨oy⟩	ㅗ이 oi			코인 koin "coin"
/p/		⟨p⟩; ⟨pe⟩; ⟨ph⟩; ⟨pp⟩	ㅍ p		ㅂ p; 프 peu	팝 pap "pop"; 타입 taip, 타이프 taipeu "type"; 커플 keopeul "couple"; 프루프 peurupeu "proof"
/ɹ/; /(ɹ)/	/ɹ/	⟨lo⟩; ⟨r⟩; ⟨re⟩; ⟨rh⟩; ⟨rps⟩; ⟨rr⟩; ⟨rt⟩	ㄹ r		omitted; 르 reu	랩 raep "rap"; 애로호 aerou; 노르웨이 Noreuwei "Norway"
/s/		⟨'s⟩; ⟨c⟩; ⟨ce⟩; ⟨s⟩; ⟨s'⟩; ⟨sc⟩; ⟨se⟩; ⟨ss⟩; ⟨st⟩; ⟨sw⟩	ㅅ s; ㅆ ss		스 seu	어썰트 eosseolteu "assault"; 키스 kiseu "kiss"; 슬립 seullip "slip"; 캐슬 kaeseul "castle"
/ʃ/		⟨ch⟩; ⟨che⟩; ⟨ci⟩; ⟨s⟩; ⟨sc⟩; ⟨sch⟩; ⟨sh⟩; ⟨si⟩; ⟨sti⟩; ⟨ti⟩	ㅅ s; sy; sw		시 si; 슈 syu	십 sip "ship"; 셰프 syepeu "chef"; 애시 aesi "ash"; 위슈 wisyu "wish"; 셸 syel, 쉘 swel "shell"
/ʃuəl/		⟨sual⟩	슈얼 syueol			컨센슈얼 keonsensyueol "consensual"
/t/		⟨bt⟩; ⟨ct⟩; ⟨t⟩; ⟨te⟩; ⟨th⟩; ⟨tt⟩; ⟨tte⟩	ㅌ t		ㅅ t; 트 teu; 츠 cheu	타이트 taiteu "tight"; 키트 kiteu "kit"; 세트 seteu "set"; 핏 pit "fit", "pit"; 트럼프 teureompeu "trump"; 배틀 baeteul "battle"; 셔츠 syeocheu "shirt"
/tjuː/	/tuː/	⟨tew⟩; ⟨tu⟩	튜 tyu			튜너 tyuneo "tuner"; 스튜디오 seutyudio "studio"; 스튜어드 seutyueodeu "steward"
/ts/		⟨t's⟩; ⟨ts⟩; ⟨tts⟩			츠 cheu	이츠 icheu "it's", "its"
/tʃ/		⟨ch⟩; ⟨tch⟩	ㅊ ch		치 chi	치킨 chikin "chicken"; 키친 kichin "kitchen"; 매치 maechi "match"
/tʃʊə(ɹ)/	/tʃʊɹ/	⟨ture⟩		추어 chueo; 츄어 chyueo		머츄어 meochueo "mature"
/tʃuəl/		⟨tual⟩		추얼 chueol; 츄얼 chyueol		버추얼 beochueol, 버츄얼 beochyueol "virtual"
/θ/		⟨th⟩; ⟨the⟩	ㅅ s		스 seu	시프 sipeu "thief"; 고섬 Goseom "Gotham"; 배스 baeseu "bath"; 스레드 seuredeu "thread"
/ʊ/		⟨oo⟩; ⟨u⟩	ㅜ u			북 buk "book"; 불 bul "bull"
/ʊə(ɹ); /ɔː(ɹ)/	/ʊɹ/	⟨oor⟩; ⟨our⟩; ⟨ure⟩		ㅜㄹ ur; ㅜ어ㄹ ueor	ㅜ어 ueo	무어 mueo "moor"; 투어 tueo "tour"; 투어리스트 tueoriseuteu "tourist"; 미주리 Mijuri "Missouri"
/uː/		⟨ew⟩; ⟨o⟩; ⟨oe⟩; ⟨oo⟩; ⟨ou⟩; ⟨ough⟩; ⟨ue⟩; ⟨ui⟩	ㅜ u			블루머 beullumeo "bloomer"
/v/		⟨ph⟩; ⟨v⟩; ⟨ve⟩; ⟨w⟩	ㅂ b		브 beu	바이킹 Baiking "Viking"; 러브 reobeu "love"
/ʌ/		⟨o⟩; ⟨oo⟩; ⟨ou⟩; ⟨u⟩	ㅓ eo			런던 Reondeon "London"
/w/		⟨w⟩; ⟨ou⟩	w			위치 wichi "witch"; 어웨이큰 eoweikeun "awaken"
/w/		⟨wh⟩	hw			화이트 hwaiteu "white"; 훼일 hweil "whale"
/wɔː(ɹ)/	/wɔːɹ/	⟨war⟩; ⟨wore⟩	wo			워 wo "war"; 워프 wopeu "warp"
/wʊ/		⟨wo⟩; ⟨woo⟩	우 u			우드 udeu "wood"; 우먼 umeon "woman"
/z/		⟨'s⟩; ⟨s⟩; ⟨sc⟩; ⟨se⟩; ⟨ss⟩; ⟨z⟩; ⟨ze⟩; ⟨zz⟩	ㅈ j		즈 jeu; 스 seu	제브러 jebeureo "zebra"; 퀴즈 kwijeu "quiz"; 퍼즐 peojeul "puzzle"; 뉴스 nyuseu "news"; 블루스 beulluseu "blues"
/ʒ/		⟨g⟩; ⟨ge⟩; ⟨si⟩; ⟨ti⟩; ⟨zi⟩		ㅈ j		텔레비전 telleobijeon "television"
/ʒuəl/		⟨sual⟩		주얼 jueol		비주얼 bijueol "visual"
