= Rendaku =

Consonant change in Japanese compound words

Rendaku (連濁; Japanese pronunciation: [ɾendakɯ], lit. 'sequential voicing') is a pronunciation change seen in the middle of some compound words in Japanese. It replaces a voiceless consonant, such as /k s t h/, with a voiced consonant, such as /ɡ z d b/. Rendaku modifies the consonant at the start of the second (or later) part of the compound. For example, the morpheme kami (paper) starts with the voiceless consonant /k/, which is replaced with the corresponding voiced consonant /ɡ/ in the compound word origami, from ori (fold) + kami.

Rendaku is common, but it does not occur in all compound words. A rule known as Lyman's law blocks rendaku when the second element already contains one of the consonants /ɡ z d b/, as in the compound word umikaze (sea breeze). Because the second element kaze (wind) contains /z/, its initial consonant /k/ remains voiceless. Rendaku is also blocked almost always when the second element of a compound is a recent loan into Japanese. Furthermore, rendaku may fail to occur even in contexts where no definite blocking factor is present.

In the Japanese writing system, rendaku affects how a morpheme is spelled when using one of the kana syllabaries: it causes the dakuten ("voicing mark", written as ゛) to be added to the upper right corner of the kana character that represents the first consonant and vowel in the second element of the compound. This is seen when comparing the hiragana spelling of kami (かみ) to that of origami (おりがみ): the kana character か (ka) in the first word is replaced with が (ga), with the dakuten, in the second. Rendaku is not marked in writing when a morpheme is spelled using kanji (logographs taken from Chinese characters). For example, kami (paper) is written with the kanji character 紙, which is unchanged when used in the spelling of origami (折り紙).

Linguistically, rendaku involves aspects of both pronunciation (phonology) and word structure (morphology); therefore, it is categorized as a morphophonological phenomenon.

== Effects ==
Consonants (in Hepburn) undergoing rendaku
Unvoiced		Voiced
k	→	g
s, sh	→	z, j
t, ch, ts	→	d, j, z
h, f	→	b

Rendaku replaces a voiceless obstruent consonant with a voiced consonant sound. For example, the voiceless alveolar plosive [t] becomes the voiced alveolar plosive [d] in the context of rendaku. In this case, the new consonant retains the same manner and place of articulation as the original consonant. However, rendaku can also cause additional changes depending on the sounds involved.

=== Pronunciation ===
In the context of Japanese phonology, some consonant sounds that seem distinct to English speakers, and that have distinct spellings in Hepburn romanization, are analyzed as allophones (contextual variants of a phoneme). The following table describes the effects of rendaku in the standard variety of Japanese, using both phonemic transcriptions (marked by slashes, such as /s/) and phonetic transcriptions (marked by square brackets, such as [ɕ]).

Consonants eligible for rendaku
Original consonant			Consonant after rendaku		
Phoneme	Allophones	Romanization	Phoneme	Allophones	Romanization
/k/	[k]	k	/ɡ/	[ɡ] or [ŋ]	g
/s/	[s]	s	/z/	[dz] or [z]	z
/s/	[ɕ]	sh	/z/	[dʑ] or [ʑ]	j
/t/	[t]	t	/d/	[d]	d
/t/	[ts]	ts	/d/ or /z/	[dz] or [z]	z
/t/	[tɕ]	ch	/d/ or /z/	[dʑ] or [ʑ]	j
/h/	[h]	h	/b/	[b]	b
/h/	[ç] (Note: More specifically, [çi] becomes [bi]: the outcome can be more narrowly transcribed as [bʲi]. However, when [ç] comes before a vowel other than /i/, it can be analyzed phonemically as /hj/: this becomes [bʲ] (phonemically /bj/) in the context of rendaku. For example, ura 'back side' + hyōshi 'book cover' gives urabyōshi 'back cover', with rendaku turning /hjoːsi/ into /bjoːsi/ (phonetically [çoːɕi] and [bʲoːɕi] respectively).)	h	/b/	[b]	b
/h/	[ɸ]	f	/b/	[b]	b

Depending on the accent and age of a speaker, the voiced velar nasal [ŋ] may be used in Japanese as an alternative to the voiced velar stop [ɡ], mainly in cases where the consonant occurs in the middle of a word. For speakers who use [ŋ] in the middle of words, [k] is replaced with [ŋ] in the context of rendaku. The sounds [ŋ] and [ɡ] are typically analyzed as allophones of a single phoneme /ɡ/ (although some phonologists have argued they are distinct phonemes for the minority of speakers who consistently distinguish them).

The voiceless affricates [ts tɕ] are commonly analyzed as allophones of /t/. Originally, [ts tɕ] corresponded to voiced affricate sounds [dz dʑ], whereas [s ɕ] corresponded to voiced fricative sounds [z ʑ]. However, the historical distinction between [dz dʑ] and [z ʑ] has been lost in the Tokyo-based standard (though not in all regional varieties of Japanese). The merged sounds may be pronounced either as voiced affricates or voiced fricatives, regardless of etymology (see yotsugana). Therefore, historical /du/ and /zu/ have merged as phonetic [(d)zɯ], and historical /di/ and /zi/ have merged as phonetic [(d)ʑi]. In the context of rendaku, dialects with the merger may be analyzed as possessing an underlying phonemic distinction between /du di/ and /zu zi/ that becomes neutralized on the phonetic level as [dzɯ dʑi]. Alternatively, Frellesvig 2010, p. 41 treats rendaku as replacing the phoneme /t/ with /z/ before /u i/. A third approach is taken by Vance 2022, who rejects the identification of [ts tɕ] as allophones of /t/, and instead postulates five voiceless phonemes /t ts s tɕ ɕ/ and three voiced phonemes /d (d)z (d)ʑ/, with rendaku turning /t/ into /d/, /ts s/ into /(d)z/, and /tɕ ɕ/ into /(d)ʑ/, respectively. (Note: In Vance's phonemic transcriptions, the non-IPA symbols /c č š ǰ/ are used to represent the sounds [ts t̠ɕ ɕ (d̠)ʑ], and /z/ is used to represent the variably affricated [(d)z] sound.)

Rendaku turns the voiceless glottal fricative /h/ into the voiced bilabial plosive /b/. This is because Japanese /h/ descends originally from a voiceless bilabial plosive */p/. Before the end of the 16th century, */p/ developed into a bilabial fricative [ɸ] or labiodental fricative [f]. (Note: This stage is documented by the transcriptions seen in a 1603 Japanese-to-Portuguese dictionary, Vocabulario da Lingoa de Iapam, which uses spellings such as fa, fi, fe, foka for words that are romanized currently as ha, hi, he, hoka.) Then, during the 17-18th centuries, this [ɸ] or [f] developed into glottal [h] before /a e o/ and palatal [ç] before /i/ or /j/, remaining [ɸ] only before the vowel phoneme /u/ (which is currently pronounced [ɯ]). As a result, in modern Japanese, rendaku replaces [ha çi ɸɯ he ho] with [ba bi bɯ be bo]. (Note: As shown in the table, the three sounds [h ç ɸ] can be analyzed as allophones of a single phoneme /h/, which means [ha çi ɸɯ he ho] can be transcribed phonemically as /ha hi hu he ho/. However, Vance 2008, pp. 77–80 departs from this analysis: he treats [h ç] as allophones of /h/, but prefers to treat [ɸ] as its own phoneme /f/, since loanwords display a contrast between [h] and [ɸ] before vowels other than /u/. Therefore, Vance transcribes [ha çi ɸɯ he ho] as /ha hi fu he ho/.)

=== Spelling ===
It is possible to characterize rendaku in terms of its effect on a morpheme's Japanese kana spelling: it adds the dakuten (voicing mark) to the first kana of the affected morpheme. The relevant graphemes are shown in the tables below (excluding yōon digraphs, which are formed by taking an i-column kana and placing a small ya, yu, or yo kana after it).

When morphemes that begin with the morae chi (ち/チ) and tsu (つ/ツ) undergo rendaku, the resulting morae ji and zu are generally spelled with the kana ぢ/ヂ and づ/ヅ, rather than the identically pronounced じ/ジ and ず/ズ. This is not a strict rule, however, and is relaxed in certain older compounds or names, especially those that are not easily recognized as compounds.

Hiragana characters affected by rendaku
	Before rendaku				
	a	i	u	e	o
K	か ka [ka]	き ki [ki]	く ku [kɯ]	け ke [ke]	こ ko [ko]
S	さ sa [sa]	し shi [ɕi]	す su [sɯ]	せ se [se]	そ so [so]
T	た ta [ta]	ち chi [tɕi]	つ tsu [tsɯ]	て te [te]	と to [to]
H	は ha [ha]	ひ hi [çi]	ふ fu [ɸɯ]	へ he [he]	ほ ho [ho]
	After rendaku (with dakuten)				
	a	i	u	e	o
G	が ga [ɡa]	ぎ gi [ɡi]	ぐ gu [ɡɯ]	げ ge [ɡe]	ご go [ɡo]
Z	ざ za [(d)za]	じ ji [(d)ʑi]	ず zu [(d)zɯ]	ぜ ze [(d)ze]	ぞ zo [(d)zo]
D	だ da [da]	ぢ ji [(d)ʑi]	づ zu [(d)zɯ]	で de [de]	ど do [do]
B	ば ba [ba]	び bi [bi]	ぶ bu [bɯ]	べ be [be]	ぼ bo [bo]

Katakana characters affected by rendaku
	Before rendaku				
	a	i	u	e	o
K	カ ka [ka]	キ ki [ki]	ク ku [kɯ]	ケ ke [ke]	コ ko [ko]
S	サ sa [sa]	シ shi [ɕi]	ス su [sɯ]	セ se [se]	ソ so [so]
T	タ ta [ta]	チ chi [tɕi]	ツ tsu [tsɯ]	テ te [te]	ト to [to]
H	ハ ha [ha]	ヒ hi [çi]	フ fu [ɸɯ]	ヘ he [he]	ホ ho [ho]
	After rendaku (with dakuten)				
	a	i	u	e	o
G	ガ ga [ɡa]	ギ gi [ɡi]	グ gu [ɡɯ]	ゲ ge [ɡe]	ゴ go [ɡo]
Z	ザ za [(d)za]	ジ ji [(d)ʑi]	ズ zu [(d)zɯ]	ゼ ze [(d)ze]	ゾ zo [(d)zo]
D	ダ da [da]	ヂ ji [(d)ʑi]	ヅ zu [(d)zɯ]	デ de [de]	ド do [do]
B	バ ba [ba]	ビ bi [bi]	ブ bu [bɯ]	ベ be [be]	ボ bo [bo]

=== Examples ===
The following table shows an example of rendaku for each major allophone of the eligible consonant sounds:

Rendaku examples
Change	Example
[k] k → [ɡ~ŋ] g	te (て, hand) + kami (かみ, paper) → tegami (てがみ, letter)
[s] s → [(d)z] z	kuro (くろ, black) + satō (さとう, sugar) → kurozatō (くろざとう, brown sugar)
[ɕ] sh → [(d)ʑ] j	tate (たて, vertical) + shima (しま, stripe) → tatejima (たてじま, vertical stripe)
[t] t → [d] d	hi (ひ, fire) + tane (たね, seed) → hidane (ひだね, spark)
[ts] ts → [(d)z] z	ari (あり, ant) + tsuka (つか, mound) → arizuka (ありづか, anthill)
[tɕ] ch → [(d)ʑ] j	hana (はな, nose) + chi (ち, blood) → hanaji (はなぢ, nosebleed)
[h] h → [b] b	se (せ, back) + hone (ほね, bone) → sebone (せぼね, backbone)
[ç] h → [b] b	hana (はな, flower) + hi (ひ, fire) → hanabi (はなび, firework)
[ɸ] f → [b] b	kawa (かわ, river) + fune (ふね, boat) → kawabune (かわぶね, river boat)

== Historical origin ==
The voiced obstruent consonants of modern Japanese come from the prenasalized obstruents of Old Japanese. Rendaku may have originated from the fusion of consonants with preceding nasal sounds derived from reduction of either the genitive postposition no (の) or the dative postposition ni (に). For example, yamadori (やまどり, copper pheasant) may be derived from yama-no-tori "mountain-gen bird", by means of no fusing with the following /t/ to form prenasalized [ⁿd] in Old Japanese. This hypothesis helps explain why rendaku is not found in all compound words. If some compounds were originally formed with no or ni, but others were formed through simple juxtaposition of roots, then rendaku would develop regularly only in the first category.

By the Old Japanese period, rendaku had already become grammatically distinct from constructions with no or ni. This is shown by the use of forms such as nadori "your bird": a corresponding phrase with no would be ungrammatical, since the genitive of the pronoun na "you" was formed exclusively with the postposition ga.

== Conditions ==
Rendaku occurs most frequently in compounds where the second element is a single morpheme of native Japanese origin that does not already contain a voiced obstruent phoneme. However, even though rendaku is usual in this context, it does not invariably occur: there are numerous exceptions pronounced without rendaku. Some compound words are pronounced with rendaku by some speakers, but without it by other speakers.

Rendaku is blocked when a voiced obstruent phoneme is already present in the second element of the compound. This rule, called Lyman's law, is highly reliable, with only a small number of exceptions.

Rendaku is also blocked if the second element is a recent loanword from a language other than Chinese (gairaigo). This rule likewise has few exceptions.

Rendaku does not affect most Sino-Japanese elements, but this tendency is less consistent. A substantial minority do undergo rendaku as the second element of a compound. It has been speculated that Sino-Japanese elements that can undergo rendaku might have become "vulgarized", that is, adopted into the same category of vocabulary as native Japanese morphemes.

Other rules have been proposed regarding circumstances where rendaku is either blocked or favored, but often, it is only possible to identify tendencies rather than inviolable rules.

=== Lyman's law ===
Lyman's law is a fundamental constraint on rendaku that prohibits voicing when the second element of a compound already contains a voiced obstruent phoneme (/ɡ/, /z/, /d/, or /b/, including allophones such as [ŋ] and [dʑ]). These phonemes are all written with the dakuten and called "muddy sounds" (濁音, dakuon) in Japanese. For example:

- yama + kado → Yamakado (surname) 山門(やまかど) ("mountain" + "gate" → place name). Rendaku does not occur because kado already contains a voiced obstruent consonant phoneme /d/. Therefore, its initial consonant /k/ remains voiceless, and the form *Yamagado やまがど does not exist (* indicates a non-existent form).
- hitori + tabi → hitoritabi ("one person" + "travel" → "traveling alone"), not *hitoridabi. Rendaku does not occur because tabi already contains a voiced obstruent consonant phoneme /b/.
- yama + kaji → yamakaji ("mountain" + "fire" → "mountain fire"), not *yamagaji. Rendaku does not occur because kaji already contains a voiced obstruent consonant phoneme /z/ (in the form of its allophone j [(d)ʑ]).

The precise formulation of Lyman's law varies between analysts. In particular, there are conflicting viewpoints on the size of the phonological domain in which it applies. One formulation states that rendaku is blocked by the presence of a voiced obstruent consonant "within a morpheme"; this may be interpreted as a consequence of a more general constraint that applies also to the underived form of native Japanese morphemes, which do not generally contain more than one voiced obstruent phoneme. An alternative view is that Lyman's law applies whenever a voiced obstruent consonant occurs anywhere within the second element of a compound, and so might also include cases where this element is composed of more than one morpheme. Rendaku occasionally (although relatively infrequently) causes voicing of the initial consonant of a Sino-Japanese (kango) lexeme that is written with two kanji, and is in etymological terms composed of two Sino-Japanese roots; it is debatable whether such lexemes count as one morpheme or two from a synchronic perspective.

In modern Japanese, the presence of a voiced obstruent phoneme in the first element does not normally block rendaku, as demonstrated by examples such as sode (そで, sleeve) + kuchi (くち, mouth) → sodeguchi (そでぐち, cuff). Nevertheless, it has been proposed that in certain circumstances, Lyman's law might be (or might once have been) sensitive to the presence of a voiced obstruent in the first element of a compound. Compound personal names ending in the element ta 'rice field' seem to usually show rendaku when the final mora of the first element contains /t k s m n/ (e.g. Katada, Fukuda, Asada, Hamada, Sanada), but never show rendaku when the final mora of the first element contains /d ɡ z b j/ (e.g. Kadota, Nagata, Mizuta, Kubota, Hayata) (and usually do not show rendaku when it contains /r w/). The pattern of voicing seen in compounds like these may in part be a residue of an older version of the law that operated in Old Japanese. Examination of Old Japanese compounds suggests that Old Japanese had a constraint against two consecutive syllables starting with a prenasalized consonant (the source of modern Japanese dakuon/voiced obstruent phonemes), but over time, this constraint came to be replaced with the modern tendency for a dakuon consonant to block rendaku only when it occurs in the second element of the compound.

Some formulations of the law state that rendaku is blocked in cases where a dakuon/voiced obstruent phoneme is the second consonant in the non-initial element of the compound. However, in modern Japanese, there is evidence that Lyman's law generally also applies to morphemes containing a dakuon consonant in their third or later syllable. This is indicated by the lack of rendaku in examples such as tsuno (つの, horn) + tokage (とかげ, lizard) → tsunotokage (つのとかげ, horned toad) or ko (こ, child) + hitsuji (ひつじ, sheep) → kohitsuji (こひつじ, lamb). There are only a handful of exceptions, such as nawa (なわ, rope) + hashigo (はしご, ladder) → nawabashigo (なわばしご, rope ladder), where voicing occurs despite the presence of a dakuon/voiced obstruent consonant in the second element of the compound. In the case of Old Japanese, there is not enough evidence to conclude whether the Old Japanese version of Lyman's law applied to morphemes containing a prenasalized consonant in their third or later syllable.

Although this law is named after Benjamin Smith Lyman, who independently propounded it in 1894, it is really a re-discovery. The Edo period linguists Kamo no Mabuchi (1765) and Motoori Norinaga (1767–1798) separately and independently identified the law during the 18th century.

=== Source language of the second element ===
Another important factor affecting the likelihood of rendaku is the etymological source or lexical stratum of the second element of the compound. Rendaku frequently affects wago (native Japanese lexemes), infrequently affects kango (Sino-Japanese vocabulary), and very rarely affects gairaigo (recent loanwords, such as borrowings from English). On the other hand, the lexical stratum of the first element of the compound is not relevant.

One possible reason for the resistance of Sino-Japanese morphemes to rendaku is the greater potential for it to cause homophony in this context. Native Japanese morphemes very rarely start with a voiced obstruent consonant, but this does not apply to Sino-Japanese; therefore, rendaku of Sino-Japanese morphemes is more likely to neutralize a contrast between distinct morphemes.

==== Kango ====
Sino-Japanese vocabulary is built from Sino-Japanese roots, which have a restricted phonological structure (one or two moras long). At least half of Sino-Japanese terms are "binoms" consisting of two roots, but some roots can be used on their own as words (mononoms). A binom is written with two kanji (Chinese characters), one for each root.

Most Sino-Japanese lexemes do not undergo rendaku when used as the second element of a compound. However, a minority (around 20% of mononoms, and 10% of binoms) do show rendaku in at least some compounds. No criteria have been identified that predict with 100% accuracy when this occurs.

In terms of phonology, rendaku is blocked by Lyman's law and so never affects a binom where the second root starts with a voiced obstruent phoneme; e.g. kōzō (構造) in shakaikōzō (社会構造, social structure), honzan (本山) in sōhonzan (総本山, head temple). (Note: As a rule, voiced obstruent consonant phonemes do not occur in the second mora of a Sino-Japanese root. An exception to this rule, and also to Lyman's law, is the name element Saburō (三郎), which can be voiced to -zaburō as the second or later element of names. Although /sabu/ here originates from Middle Chinese sam 'three', this is not a regular Sino-Japanese reading. Compare the regular on reading of 三 as san.) Based on a study of how native speakers pronounced novel compounds, Low 2009 concluded that rendaku is statistically less likely to affect a Sino-Japanese binom where the first root ends in the moraic nasal /N/ and the second root end in a voiceless obstruent, although it is not fully blocked in this context (the study's observed rate of rendaku in this context was 1.3%, compared to Vance 1996's dictionary-based estimate of rendaku affecting 10% of all Sino-Japanese binoms).

Examples of rendaku in compounds ending in a Sino-Japanese mononom
Kanji	Romanization	Translation
火 + 鉢 → 火鉢	hi + hachi → hibachi	"fire" + "bowl" → "brazier; hibachi"
寝 + 相 → 寝相	ne + sō → nezō	"sleep" + "appearance" → "sleeping posture"

Examples of rendaku in compounds ending in a Sino-Japanese binom
Kanji	Romanization	Translation
親 + 会社 → 親会社	oya + kaisha → oyagaisha	"parent" + "company" → "parent company"
株式 + 会社 → 株式会社	kabushiki + kaisha → kabushikigaisha	"stock-type" + "company" → "joint-stock company"
客 + 布団 → 客布団	kyaku + futon → kyakubuton	"guest" + "bedding" → "bedding for guests"

The suffix -chū (中), without rendaku, means "during, doing", while the suffix -jū (中), with rendaku, means "throughout".

Sino-Japanese roots that start with voiceless obstruents may have variant pronunciations starting with voiced obstruent phonemes for other reasons aside from rendaku.

One reason is the existence of different readings of Sino-Japanese roots, corresponding in general to different time periods of borrowing. Two of the most important types of reading are termed Go-on and Kan-on. Some (though not all) Kan-on readings starting with /k s t h/ correspond regularly to Go-on readings starting with /ɡ z d b/: these represent different adaptations of Early Middle Chinese voiced obstruent sounds, and so the existence of these alternative pronunciations is unrelated in origin to rendaku.

An example is the root 地 'ground, land', which has both a Kan-on pronunciation chi [tɕi] and a Go-on pronunciation ji [(d)ʑi]. For this reason, the use of the voiced pronunciation in compounds such as roji (路地, lane, alley) cannot necessarily be attributed to rendaku, since the ji version of this root can also be found at the start of a word, e.g. in jishin (地震, earthquake).

In addition, a minority of lexemes composed of two Sino-Japanese roots display a type of sequential voicing, affecting only roots in second position, that is indistinguishable in effect from rendaku, but probably has a distinct origin in terms of morphology. The relevant context is forms such as 東国 tōgoku (eastern provinces) and 中国 Chūgoku (China)}, which appear to display rendaku on their second element 国 koku (country). In this case, voicing is hypothesized to be the result of the preceding Sino-Japanese roots, 東 (Middle Chinese tuwng → /toũ) and 中 (Middle Chinese trjuwng → /tjuũ/) originally ending in a nasal sound, which caused the following consonant to become prenasalized and voiced. Prenasalization and voicing of a consonant after a nasal sound (/ũ, ĩ, N/) is hypothesized to have been an active phonological rule up through Early Middle Japanese; in Late Middle Japanese, /ũ, ĩ/ were denasalized and voicing after /N/ ceased to be automatic.

==== Gairaigo ====
Gairaigo vocabulary is usually not affected by rendaku when it occurs as the second element of a compound, as illustrated by the contrast between garasudana 'glass shelf', from native Japanese tana 'shelf', and garasukēsu 'glass case', from foreign kēsu 'case': rendaku does not occur and is not expected to occur in the latter compound word, since its non-initial element belongings to foreign vocabulary. In contrast, as shown by garasudana, the use of a gairaigo word as the first element of a compound does not prevent rendaku of a following native element. Examples where rendaku affects a gairaigo element of a compound are highly exceptional. (Note: Some examples of rendaku in compounds ending in gairaigo elements include amagappa "raincoat", from ame "rain" + kappa "raincoat", from the Portuguese word capa ("cloak; cape"); irohagaruta, from iroha + karuta, from the Portuguese word carta ("card"); and mizugiseru "hooka", from mizu "water" + kiseru "pipe", from Khmer khsiə ("pipe").)

=== Part of speech ===
Rendaku affects compounds involving various parts of speech, such as noun + verb, adjective + noun, verb + noun, verb + adjective; however, it is rare in compounds of the form verb + verb.

Noun + na-adjective/noun → noun
Hiragana	Romanization	Translation
おんな + すき → おんなずき	onna + suki → onnazuki	"female person" + "liking; fondness" → "fondness for women; woman lover"
おとこ + きらい → おとこぎらい	otoko + kirai → otokogirai	"male person" + "dislike; hatred" → "dislike for men; misandry"

Ending in i-adjective → i-adjective
Hiragana	Romanization	Translation
うす- + くらい → うすぐらい	usu- + kurai → usugurai	"faint-; light-" + "dark" → "dim"
くち + きたない → くちぎたない	kuchi + kitanai → kuchigitanai	"mouth" + "dirty" → "foulmouthed; scurrilous"

Noun + verb → verb
Hiragana	Romanization	Translation
め + ふく → めぶく	me + fuku → mebuku	"sprout" + "to blow" → "to bud"
くま + とる → くまどる	kuma + toru → kumadoru	"shade, shadow" + "to take" → "to shade, to tint; to put on kumadori"

Verb (ren'yōkei) + noun → noun
Hiragana	Romanization	Translation
いける → いけ + はな → いけばな	ikeru → ike + hana → ikebana	"to keep alive" + "flower" → "flower arrangement"
おる → おり + かみ → おりがみ	oru → ori + kami → origami	"to fold" + "paper" → "paperfolding"

Verb (ren'yōkei) + verb → verb
Hiragana	Romanization	Translation
たつ → たち + とまる → たちどまる	tatsu → tachi + tomaru → tachidomaru	"to stand; to start; to ignite" + "to stop" → "to stop"

Verb (ren'yōkei) + verb (ren'yōkei) → noun
Hiragana	Romanization	Translation
おく → おき + さる → さり → おきざり	oku → oki + saru → sari → okizari	"putting" + "leaving" → "deserting"
くるう → くるい + さく → さき → くるいざき	kuruu → kurui + saku → saki → kuruizaki	"being in disarray" + "blooming" → "unseasonable blooming"

=== Reduplication ===
Rendaku is very frequent in words formed by reduplication, other than mimetic words, which are immune to rendaku.

Examples:

ひと + ひと → ひとびと (人々) (iteration)

hito + hito → hitobito ("person" + "person" → "people")

とき + とき → ときどき (時々) (iteration)

toki + toki → tokidoki ("time" + "time" → "sometimes")

=== Semantics ===
Rendaku tends not to occur in non-reduplicative compounds which have the semantic value of "X and Y" (so-called dvandva or copulative compounds), as exemplified by yama + kawa > yamakawa "mountains and rivers", as opposed to yama + kawa > yamagawa "mountain river".

=== Branching compounds ===
In compounds containing more than two elements (or compounds where one element is itself a compound), the branching structure of the compound may affect the application of rendaku. For example, todana, a compound of the morphemes to "door" and tana "shelf", retains its initial voiceless /t/ when used as the second element of the compound fukurotodana "small cupboard". In examples like this, where the second element contains a voiced consonant as a result of rendaku, the lack of voicing at the start of the second element of the larger compound can potentially be explained as a consequence of Lyman's law.

Otsu 1980 proposed that rendaku is blocked in general in the left-branching elements of a right-branching compound, even in cases where Lyman's law does not apply. However, other linguists have questioned the validity or necessity of formulating such a constraint. The branching constraint is intended to explain the contrasting behavior of examples such as the following:

mon + [shiro + chō] > monshirochō, not *monjirochō ("family crest" + ["white" + "butterfly"] > "cabbage butterfly")

but

[o + shiro] + washi > ojirowashi (["tail" + "white"] + "eagle" > "white-tailed eagle")

This constraint does not apply to all words where the second element is composed of more than one morpheme. As discussed above, rendaku can affect Sino-Japanese "binoms" composed of two Sino-Japanese roots. Assuming the branching constraint is valid, it is possible it does not prevent rendaku in that context because Sino-Japanese binoms do not have the morphological status of compound words in the context of rendaku. In any case, there seem to be some counterexamples to the branching constraint, such as ōburoshiki 'big talk', from ō- 'big' + furoshiki, from furo 'bath' + shiki 'carpet', or machibikeshi 'fire brigade for common people', from machi 'town' + hikeshi, from hi 'fire' + keshi 'to extinguish'. Other examples where rendaku appears to affect "multi-root" elements that are themselves composed of smaller elements (at least in terms of etymology) include the following:

- izakaya (居酒屋) 'tavern', from i 'staying' + sakaya 'saké-shop', from saka- 'saké-' + -ya '-shop'
- hitozukiai (人付き合い) 'socializing with people', from hito 'person' + tsukiai (人付き合い)'socializing', from tsuki 'attaching' + ai 'matching'
- kozeriai (小競り合い) 'skirmish', from ko 'small' + seriai 'competition', from seri 'vying' + ai 'matching'
- shitabirame (舌平目) 'sole (fish)', from shita 'tongue' + hirame 'flounder', from hira 'flat' + me 'eye'

Otsu accounted for apparent counterexamples to the branching rule by postulating a distinction between "loose" and "strict" compounds. Per Otsu, loose compounds are formed in a productive manner, have a predictable meaning based on their components, and follow the general accentuation rules for compound words. Loose compounds are hypothesized to be immune to rendaku when used as the right-hand element of a larger compound, whereas "strict" compounds can undergo rendaku the same way as single morphemes. However, Vance 2022 argues it is not clear that these criteria can really be applied reliably to predict whether a compound is "loose" or "strict" for the purposes of rendaku.

The branching constraint analysis could be considered a violation of the Atom Condition, which states that "in lexical derivations from X, only features realized on X are accessible." An alternative view proposes that the process applies cyclically.

[nuri + hashi] + ire > nuribashiire ([lacquered chopstick] case, "case for lacquered chopsticks")
nuri + [hashi + ire] > nurihashiire (lacquered [chopstick case], "lacquered case for chopsticks")

This could be seen as the voicing between hashi and ire staying unrealized but still activating Lyman's law.

Ito and Mester 2003 proposed a third account distinct from both Otsu 1980's branching-based constraint and Ito and Mester 1986's cyclical account. This hypothesis holds that the relationship between branching and rendaku is not direct, but is mediated by prosodic structure: the lack of rendaku in right-branching compounds such as hatsu kao awase is analyzed as a consequence of kao coming at the start of a prosodic word. Per Ito and Mester 2007, whether a compound is treated as one or as multiple prosodic words is affected by the length of the second element of the compound: if the second element is longer than four moras (or two bimoraic feet), then the compound is required to have the prosody of a phrase rather than a single word.

=== Further considerations ===
In some cases, rendaku varies depending on syntax. For instance, the suffix tōri (〜通り; "road, following"), from tōru (通る; "to go, to follow"), is pronounced as -tōri (〜とおり) following a perfective verb, as in omotta-tōri (思った通り; "as I thought"), but is pronounced as -dōri (〜どおり; with rendaku) when following a noun, as in yotei-dōri (予定通り; "as planned, according to schedule") or, semantically differently – more concretely – Muromachi-dōri (室町通; "Muromachi Street"). However, the case following a perfective verb may also be seen as two words, a verb modifying a noun, rather than the suffix seen following nouns. The suffix -chū (中), without rendaku, means "during, doing", while the suffix -jū (中), with rendaku despite kango normally not undergoing it, means "throughout".

Most Japanese family names are compounds, and rendaku may or may not affect the second element of a compound name. Some names are read in different ways for different people, and have both a reading with rendaku and one without, such as 中田 (which can be either Nakata or Nakada, among other readings).

==== Lexical propensity ====
It has been hypothesized that morphemes are inherently either more susceptible or more resistant to being voiced when used as the second element of a compound; in other words, that the propensity of a morpheme to undergo rendaku is lexically specified. Some morphemes show voicing in all compounds in which they occur. At the far end of the spectrum, a small percentage of morphemes appear to be immune to rendaku (for reasons not explained by the phonological, morphosyntactic, and lexical-stratum factors described above that regularly block rendaku). Other morphemes are intermediate and undergo voicing in some but not all compounds. Irwin 2016 found that out of elements that occurred at least 5 times in second position in a database of frequent compound words, the most common behavior (42%) was to undergo voicing in all compounds, and each range of greater resistance to rendaku contained successively fewer elements (35% had voicing rates from 0.667 to 0.999; 12% had voicing rates from 0.334 to 0.666; 7% had voicing rates from 0.001 to 0.333, and 5% were never voiced).

Rosen 2016 suggests that the first element of compound words also has a lexically variable propensity to trigger rendaku, hypothesizing that rendaku occurs in words where the combination of these two voicing weights (the rendaku-triggering weight of the first element and the rendaku-undergoing weight of the second element) exceeds a threshold value, and fails to occur when this value falls below the threshold.

==== Word length ====
In some circumstances, rendaku appears to be affected by the length of a compound word, as measured in moras. Certain second elements that have a length of one or two moras tend to resist rendaku when combined with a first element that is one or two moras long. (A compound where both elements are short can be called a "short-short compound"). For example, kusa (grass) occurs without rendaku in a number of short-short compounds, such as aokusa (green grass) and irakusa (nettle). However, these resistant elements undergo rendaku in compounds where the first element is three or more moras long, such as hahakogusa (cottonweed).

==== Avoidance of bVmV ====
Rendaku seems to be avoided in non-verbal elements that start with [h] or [ç] + vowel + /m/ + vowel, such as hama, hamo, hima, hime, himo, hema, which has been explained as an effect of a preference against having homorganic consonants at the start of adjacent syllables: rendaku would replace [h] or [ç] with [b], which is bilabial like [m]. Rendaku is seen before vowel + /m/ + vowel in koibumi 'love letter' from fumi 'letter': this is consistent with the hypothesis, since [ɸɯmi] contains [ɸ], which is already homorganic with [m] (and so avoiding rendaku would not make any difference). An alternative explanation supposes that fumi, as well as other words that undergo rendaku to /b/, starts with an underlying labial consonant that is phonologically distinct from the /h/ found at the start of lexemes that do not undergo rendaku.

A study observed this tendency as an active factor affecting the frequency with which Japanese speakers preferred rendaku vs. non-rendaku variants of nonce words.

For whatever reason, this avoidance is not seen in verb roots (including deverbal nouns), which undergo rendaku even in cases such as mushibamu 'to corrupt'.

No comparable effect is seen with other consonant sounds that undergo rendaku, since they retain the same place of articulation after the change.

== Productivity ==
Although rendaku does not occur in all compounds, it is common and studies of Japanese native speakers show that it occurs often in newly formed compounds. It has been suggested that its productivity in new compounds is caused by analogy with existing compound words.

=== Acquisition by children ===
Some studies have examined the phonological development of rendaku. Studies from the late 1990s and early 2000s indicate that children under five and a half years old show limited use of rendaku in any context. The use of rendaku in established compounds becomes frequent by the age of six, but children below this age do not show reliable use of rendaku in unfamiliar compounds. Children over the age of six use rendaku frequently both in familiar and unfamiliar compounds.

== Theoretical analysis ==
In linguistics, rendaku has been analyzed in terms of various phonological theories. It has been popular to identify Lyman's law, the restriction against applying rendaku to a morpheme that already contains a voiced obstruent phoneme, as an example of a more general theoretical concept known as the obligatory contour principle (or "OCP" for short). This principle was originally formulated (by Leben 1973) to refer to the phonology of tone, and referred to a hypothesized constraint against having consecutive identical tones in the underlying representation of a morpheme. Later phonologists have interpreted the principle as a more general constraint, using it to refer also to bans on identical adjacent specifications of various non-tone features. Thus, Lyman's law has been interpreted as an example where the obligatory contour principle (OCP) applies to voicing specifications and rules out multiple occurrences of voicing within a morpheme.

== Rendaku in Tōhoku dialects ==
In the Kahoku dialect of Tōhoku, the phonemes /t k ts tɕ/ have voiced allophones [d ɡ dz dʑ] when they come between voiced vowels, and the phonemes /b d ɡ z dʑ/ have prenasalized or nasal allophones [ᵐb ⁿd ᵑɡ~ŋ ⁿdz ⁿdʑ] when they come between vowels: for example, /mato/ 'target' is pronounced [mɑdo] (with a second consonant that is voiced but not prenasalized) whereas /mado/ 'window' is pronounced [mɑ̃ⁿdo] (with both voicing and prenasalization of the second consonant). Thus, rendaku in this dialect, when it occurs, typically involves phonetic prenasalization of the second element of the compound, as is speculated to have been the case in prehistoric Japanese: e.g. /hama/ 'beach" + /kuri/ 'chestnut' → /hamaɡuri/ [hɑmɑ̃ᵑɡɯɾɨ] 'clam'. However, the use of prenasalization at the start of the second element of a compound word is not uniform, and depending on the speakers and the words pronounced, significant variations were observed. There was a relationship between the rate of prenasalization and the speakers’ age: older individuals use prenasalized pronunciations at a higher rate than younger individuals. On the other hand, differences in the speakers’ gender and socioeconomic status did not affect the rate of prenasalization. It is speculated that dialect mixing with standard Japanese may have increased the use of pronunciations without prenasalization. In the case of /b/ [ᵐb], loss of prenasalization may also have additionally been facilitated by the fact that the resulting sound [b] did not merge with any preexisting phoneme, since /p/ does not occur intervocalically in non-mimetic vocabulary (in contrast, in forms like [te̝ɡɑmɨ], the absence of prenasalization makes it possible to interpret the consonant [ɡ] as merely the voiced intervocalic allophone of /k/, which would result in the phonemic transcription /tekami/, with the same consonant phoneme as the independent word /kami/).

A Tōhoku dialect spoken in Iwate Prefecture has been reported to have a phonotactic constraint prohibiting prenasalized obstruents from occurring in two successive syllables; this rule produces regular denasalization in [kɑ̃ᵐbɑbɨ] 'ceremonial fire' as opposed to [hɑnɑ̃ᵐbi] 'fireworks'. The same constraint is hypothesized for Old Japanese, and may be the source of Lyman's law in modern Standard Japanese.

== See also ==
- Consonant mutation
- Lenition
- Sandhi

== Bibliography ==
- Dexter, Kristen (14 August 2018). "Rendaku: Why Hito-Bito isn't Hito-Hito". Tofugu.
- Endō, Kunimoto (1981). "Hi-rendaku no Hōsoku no Shōchō to Sono Imi: Dakushiin to Bion to no Kankei kara" 非連濁の法則の消長とその意味―濁子音と鼻音との関係から―. Kokugo Kokubun 国語国文. 50–3. (Japanese citation: 遠藤邦基(1981)「非連濁の法則の消長とその意味―濁子音と鼻音との関係から―」(『国語国文』50-3))
- Frellesvig, Bjarke (2010). A History of the Japanese Language. Cambridge University Press.
- Fukuda, Suzy E. (2002). "The acquisition of rendaku: A linguistic investigation". Aoyama Journal of General Education. 43: 15–59.
- Fukuda, Suzy E.; Fukuda, Shinji (1999). "The operation of rendaku in the Japanese specifically language-impaired: A preliminary investigation". Folia Phoniatrica et Logopaedica. 51 (1–2): 36–54. doi:10.1159/000021480.
- Hirayama, Manami (2005). "Place asymmetry and markedness of labials in Japanese". Toronto Working Papers in Linguistics. 24: 125–168.
- Irwin, Mark (April 2005). "Rendaku-based Lexical Hierarchies in Japanese: The Behaviour of Sino-Japanese Mononoms in Hybrid Noun Compounds". Journal of East Asian Linguistics. 14 (2): 121–153. doi:10.1007/s10831-004-6306-9. ISSN 0925-8558. S2CID 55842710.
- Irwin, Mark (2011), Loanwords in Japanese, John Benjamins, ISBN 978-90-2720592-6
- Irwin, Mark (2016). "The Rendaku Database". In Vance, Timothy J.; Irwin, Mark (eds.). Sequential Voicing in Japanese: Papers from the NINJAL Rendaku Project. Studies in Language Companion Series. Vol. 176. John Benjamins. doi:10.1075/slcs.176. ISBN 978-90-272-5941-7. S2CID 64058981.
- Itō, Shingo (1928). Kinsei Kokugoshi. Ōsaka: Tachikawa Bunmeidō.
- Ito, Junko; Mester, Ralf-Armin (1986). "The Phonology of Voicing in Japanese: Theoretical Consequences for Morphological Accessibility" (PDF). Linguistic Inquiry. 17.
- Ito, Junko; Mester, Armin (2003). Japanese Morphophonemics: Markedness and Word Structure. MIT Press.
- Ito, Junko; Mester, Armin (2007). "Prosodic Adjunction in Japanese Compounds" (PDF). MIT Working Papers in Linguistics. 55: 97–111.
- Kawahara, Shigeto (2015), "Can we use rendaku for phonological argumentation?", Linguistics Vanguard, 1 (1): 3–14, doi:10.1515/lingvan-2015-0001
- Kawahara, Shigeto (2018), "Phonology and orthography: The orthographic characterization of rendaku and Lyman's Law.", Glossa: A Journal of General Linguistics, 3 (1): 1–24, doi:10.5334/gjgl.368
- Kawahara, Shigeto; Ono, Hajime; Sudo, Kiyoshi (2006), "Consonant Cooccurrence Restrictions in Yamato Japanese", Japanese/Korean Linguistics, 14: 27–38
- Kubozono, Haruo (2005). "Rendaku: Its Domain and Linguistic Conditions" ( (PDF)). In Jeroen van de Weijer; Kensuke Nanjo; Tetsuo Nishihara (eds.). Voicing in Japanese. Studies in Generative Grammar. Berlin, New York: Mouton de Gruyter. pp. 5–24. doi:10.1515/9783110197686.1.5. ISBN 978-3-11-018600-0. Archived from the original on 2004-09-12.
- Kumagai, Gakuji (2020), Testing the OCP-labial effect on Japanese rendaku
- Labrune, Laurence (2012), The Phonology of Japanese, Oxford, England: Oxford University Press, ISBN 978-0-19-954583-4
- Low, James (2009). Issues in Rendaku: Solving the Nasal Paradox and Reevaluating Current Theories of Sequential Voicing in Japanese (PDF) (Linguistics BA thesis). Pomona College. Archived from the original (PDF) on 2016-03-03.
- Martin, Samuel E. (1987). The Japanese Language Through Time. New Haven: Yale University Press. ISBN 0-300-03729-5.
- Miyashita, Mizuki; Irwin, Mark; Wilson, Ian; Vance, Timothy J. (2016-06-13). "Rendaku in Tōhoku Japanese: The Kahoku-chō Survey". In Vance, Timothy J.; Irwin, Mark (eds.). Sequential Voicing in Japanese. Studies in Language Companion Series. Vol. 176. doi:10.1075/slcs.176. ISBN 978-90-272-5941-7. ISSN 0165-7763.
- Ohno, Kazutoshi (2000), "The lexical nature of rendaku in Japanese", in Nakayama, Mineharu; Quinn, Charles J. Jr. (eds.), Japanese/Korean linguistics 9, Center for the Study of Language and Information, Stanford University, pp. 151–164
- Ota, Mitsuhiko (2015), "L1 phonology: phonological development", in Kubozono, Haruo (ed.), Handbook of Japanese Phonetics and Phonology, Berlin: De Gruyter, pp. 681–718, doi:10.1515/9781614511984.681, ISBN 978-1-61451-252-3
- Otsu, Yukio (1980). "Some aspects of rendaku in Japanese and related problems". MIT Working Papers in Linguistics: Theoretical Issues in Japanese Linguistics 2: 207–227.
- Rice, Keren (2002). "Sequential voicing, postnasal voicing, and Lyman's Law revisited*" (PDF). University of Toronto. Archived from the original (PDF) on 2016-03-03.
- Rosen, Eric (2003), "Systematic Irregularity in Japanese Rendaku : How the grammar mediates patterned lexical exceptions", The Canadian Journal of Linguistics / La revue canadienne de linguistique, 48 (1): 1–37, doi:10.1353/cjl.2004.0010
- Rosen, Eric (2016), "Predicting the unpredictable: Capturing the apparent semi-regularity of rendaku voicing in Japanese through harmonic grammar" (PDF), Proceedings of the Berkeley Linguistics Society, 42: 235–249
- Shibatani, Masayoshi (1990). The Languages of Japan. Cambridge; New York: Cambridge University Press. pp. 173–175. ISBN 0-521-36918-5.
- Suzuki, Yutaka (2004). "'Rendaku' no Koshō ga Kakuritsu suru made: Rendaku Kenkyū Zenshi" 「連濁」の呼称が確立するまで―連濁研究前史―. Kokubungaku kenkyū 国文学研究. 142. Japanese citation: 鈴木豊(2004)「「連濁」の呼称が確立するまで―連濁研究前史―」(『国文学研究』142)
- Tanaka, Yu (2017). The sound pattern of Japanese surnames (PDF) (Linguistics PhD thesis). University of California, Los Angeles.
- Uwano, Zendō (2015), "Bidakuon 2-dai", NINJAL Colloquium Series, Tokyo
- Vance, Timothy J. (1982), "On the Origin of Voicing Alteration in Japanese Consonants", Journal of the American Oriental Society, 102 (2): 333–341, doi:10.2307/602532, JSTOR 602532
- Vance, Timothy J. (1987). An Introduction to Japanese Phonology. Albany, N.Y.: State University of New York Press. ISBN 0-88706-361-6.
- Vance, Timothy J. (2008), The Sounds of Japanese, Cambridge University Press, ISBN 978-0-5216-1754-3
- Vance, Timothy J. (2015), "Rendaku", in Kubozono, Haruo (ed.), Handbook of Japanese Phonetics and Phonology, Berlin: De Gruyter, pp. 397–442, doi:10.1515/9781614511984.397, ISBN 978-1-61451-252-3
- Vance, Timothy J. (2022). Irregular Phonological Marking of Japanese Compounds. De Gruyter.
- Weijer, Jeroen van de (2005). Kensuke Nanjo; Tetsuo Nishihara (eds.). Voicing in Japanese. Berlin, New York: Mouton de Gruyter. ISBN 978-3-11-018600-0.
- Yamaguchi, Yoshinori (1988). "Kodaigo no Fukugō ni Kansuru Ichi-kōsatsu: Rendaku o Megutte" 古代語の複合語に関する一考察―連濁をめぐって―. Nihongo-gaku 日本語学 [Japanese Linguistics]. 7–5. (Japanese citation: 山口佳紀(1988)「古代語の複合語に関する一考察―連濁をめぐって―」(『日本語学』7-5))
