= Tsu (kana) =

Japanese kana

tsu

Hiragana	Katakana
- Transliteration: tsu, tu
- Translit. with dakuten: zu, dzu, du
- Hiragana origin: 川
- Katakana origin: 川
- Man'yōgana: 都 豆 通 追 川 津
- Voiced man'yōgana: 豆 頭 弩
- Spelling kana: つるかめのツ (Tsurukame no "tsu")
- Unicode: U+3064, U+30C4
- Braille: ⠝

Tsu (hiragana: つ, katakana: ツ) is one of the Japanese kana, each of which represents one mora. Both are phonemically /tɯ/, reflected in the Nihon-shiki and Kunrei-shiki Romanization tu, although for phonological reasons, the actual pronunciation is [t͡sɯᵝ], reflected in the Hepburn romanization tsu.

The small kana っ/ッ, known as sokuon, are identical but somewhat smaller. They are mainly used to indicate consonant gemination and commonly used at the end of lines of dialogue in fictional works as a symbol for a glottal stop.

The dakuten forms づ, ヅ, usually pronounced the same as the dakuten forms of the su kana in most dialects (see yotsugana), are uncommon. They are primarily used for indicating a voiced consonant in the middle of a compound word (see rendaku), and they can never begin a word.

In the Ainu language, it can be written with a handakuten (which can be entered into a computer as either one character (ツ゚) or two combined characters (ツ゜) to represent the sound [tu͍], which is interchangeable with the katakana ト゚.

The katakana form has become popular as an emoticon in the Western world due to its resemblance to a smiling face and as part of a "shrug" emoticon, known alternatively as Shruggie, rendered as: ¯\_(ツ)_/¯ .

Forms	Rōmaji	Hiragana	Katakana
Normal ts- (た行 ta-gyō)	tsu	つ	ツ
Normal ts- (た行 ta-gyō)	tsuu, tswu tsū	つう, つぅ つー	ツウ, ツゥ ツー
Addition dakuten d/z- (だ行 da-gyō)	zu, dzu	づ	ヅ
Addition dakuten d/z- (だ行 da-gyō)	zuu, zwu zū, dzū	づう, づぅ づー	ヅウ, ヅゥ ヅー

Other additional forms

Form A (ts-)
Romaji	Hiragana	Katakana
tsa, tswa	つぁ	ツァ
tswa	つゎ	ツヮ
tsi, tswi	つぃ	ツィ
(tswu)	(つぅ)	(ツゥ)
tse, tswe	つぇ	ツェ
tso, tswo	つぉ	ツォ
tsya	つゃ	ツャ
tsyu	つゅ	ツュ
tsye	つぃぇ	ツィェ
tsyo	つょ	ツョ

Form B (z-)
Romaji	Hiragana	Katakana
dza, dzwa	づぁ	ヅァ
zwa	づゎ	ヅヮ
dzi, dzwi, zwi	づぃ	ヅィ
(zwu)	(づぅ)	(ヅゥ)
dze, zwe	づぇ	ヅェ
dzo, zwo	づぉ	ヅォ
zya, dzya	づゃ	ヅャ
zyu, dzyu	づゅ	ヅュ
zye, dzye	づぃぇ	ヅィェ
zyo, dzyo	づょ	ヅョ

- ヅァ (dza), ヅェ (dze) and ヅォ (dzo) are used in gairaigos; these pronunciations are not same as ズァ (zwa), ズェ (zwe) and ズォ (zwo).

== Stroke order ==
Stroke order in writing つ

Stroke order in writing ツ

Stroke order in writing つ

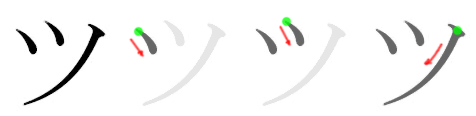
Stroke order in writing ツ

== Other communicative representations ==
Japanese radiotelephony alphabet	Wabun code
つるかめのツ; Tsurukame no "Tsu"	▄ ▄▄▄ ▄▄▄ ▄

Japanese Navy Signal Flag

Japanese semaphore
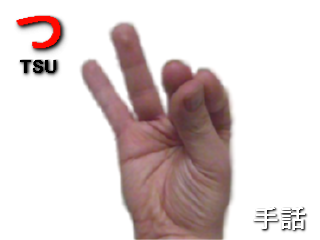
Japanese manual syllabary (fingerspelling)
Braille dots-1345
Japanese Braille

=== Braille forms ===
つ / ツ in Japanese Braille
っ / ッ sokuon	つ / ツ tsu	づ / ヅ zu/du	つう / ツー tsū	づう / ヅー zū/dū	Other kana based on Braille つ			
っ / ッ sokuon	つ / ツ tsu	づ / ヅ zu/du	つう / ツー tsū	づう / ヅー zū/dū	ちゅ / チュ chu	ぢゅ / ヂュ ju/dyu	ちゅう / チュー chū	ぢゅう / ヂュー jū/dyū
⠂ (braille pattern dots-2)	⠝ (braille pattern dots-1345)	⠐ (braille pattern dots-5) ⠝ (braille pattern dots-1345)	⠝ (braille pattern dots-1345) ⠒ (braille pattern dots-25)	⠐ (braille pattern dots-5) ⠝ (braille pattern dots-1345) ⠒ (braille pattern dots-25)	⠈ (braille pattern dots-4) ⠝ (braille pattern dots-1345)	⠘ (braille pattern dots-45) ⠝ (braille pattern dots-1345)	⠈ (braille pattern dots-4) ⠝ (braille pattern dots-1345) ⠒ (braille pattern dots-25)	⠘ (braille pattern dots-45) ⠝ (braille pattern dots-1345) ⠒ (braille pattern dots-25)

=== Computer encodings ===
Character information
Preview	つ		ツ		ﾂ		っ		ッ	
Unicode name	HIRAGANA LETTER TU		KATAKANA LETTER TU		HALFWIDTH KATAKANA LETTER TU		HIRAGANA LETTER SMALL TU		KATAKANA LETTER SMALL TU	
Encodings	decimal	hex	dec	hex	dec	hex	dec	hex	dec	hex
Unicode	12388	U+3064	12484	U+30C4	65410	U+FF82	12387	U+3063	12483	U+30C3
UTF-8	227 129 164	E3 81 A4	227 131 132	E3 83 84	239 190 130	EF BE 82	227 129 163	E3 81 A3	227 131 131	E3 83 83
Numeric character reference	&#12388;	&#x3064;	&#12484;	&#x30C4;	&#65410;	&#xFF82;	&#12387;	&#x3063;	&#12483;	&#x30C3;
Shift JIS	130 194	82 C2	131 99	83 63	194	C2	130 193	82 C1	131 98	83 62
EUC-JP	164 196	A4 C4	165 196	A5 C4	142 194	8E C2	164 195	A4 C3	165 195	A5 C3
GB 18030	164 196	A4 C4	165 196	A5 C4	132 49 153 48	84 31 99 30	164 195	A4 C3	165 195	A5 C3
EUC-KR / UHC	170 196	AA C4	171 196	AB C4			170 195	AA C3	171 195	AB C3
Big5 (non-ETEN kana)	198 200	C6 C8	199 92	C7 5C			198 199	C6 C7	199 91	C7 5B
Big5 (ETEN / HKSCS)	199 75	C7 4B	199 192	C7 C0			199 74	C7 4A	199 191	C7 BF

Character information
Preview	ｯ		づ		ヅ		ツ゚		㋡	
Unicode name	HALFWIDTH KATAKANA LETTER SMALL TU		HIRAGANA LETTER DU		KATAKANA LETTER DU		KATAKANA LETTER AINU TU		CIRCLED KATAKANA TU	
Encodings	decimal	hex	dec	hex	dec	hex	dec	hex	dec	hex
Unicode	65391	U+FF6F	12389	U+3065	12485	U+30C5	12484 12442	U+30C4+309A	13025	U+32E1
UTF-8	239 189 175	EF BD AF	227 129 165	E3 81 A5	227 131 133	E3 83 85	227 131 132 227 130 154	E3 83 84 E3 82 9A	227 139 161	E3 8B A1
GB 18030	132 49 151 49	84 31 97 31	164 197	A4 C5	165 197	A5 C5	165 196 129 57 167 50	A5 C4 81 39 A7 32	129 57 211 51	81 39 D3 33
Numeric character reference	&#65391;	&#xFF6F;	&#12389;	&#x3065;	&#12485;	&#x30C5;	&#12484;&#12442;	&#x30C4;&#x309A;	&#13025;	&#x32E1;
Shift JIS (plain)	175	AF	130 195	82 C3	131 100	83 64				
Shift JIS-2004	175	AF	130 195	82 C3	131 100	83 64	131 157	83 9D		
EUC-JP (plain)	142 175	8E AF	164 197	A4 C5	165 197	A5 C5				
EUC-JIS-2004	142 175	8E AF	164 197	A4 C5	165 197	A5 C5	165 253	A5 FD		
EUC-KR / UHC			170 197	AA C5	171 197	AB C5				
Big5 (non-ETEN kana)			198 201	C6 C9	199 93	C7 5D				
Big5 (ETEN / HKSCS)			199 76	C7 4C	199 193	C7 C1				

== See also ==
- Sokuon
- Dakuten and Handakuten
- Kanji
- Chōonpu
