= Su (kana) =

su

Hiragana	Katakana
- Transliteration: su
- Translit. with dakuten: zu
- Hiragana origin: 寸
- Katakana origin: 須
- Man'yōgana: 寸 須 周 酒 州 洲 珠 数 酢 栖 渚
- Voiced man'yōgana: 受 授 殊 儒
- Spelling kana: すずめのス (Suzume no "su")

Su (hiragana: す, katakana: ス) is one of the Japanese kana, each of which represents one mora. Their shapes come from the kanji 寸 and 須, respectively. Both kana represent the sound [sɯ]. In the Ainu language, the katakana ス can be written as small ㇲ to represent a final s and is used to emphasize the pronunciation of [s] rather than the normal [ɕ] (represented in Ainu as ㇱ). In loanwords, this dakuten form of this kana, as opposed to ツ's dakuten form, can be used when transliterating "ds" such as kids キッズ kizzu and birds ば—っず.

Forms	Rōmaji	Hiragana	Katakana
Normal s- (さ行 sa-gyō)	su	す	ス
Normal s- (さ行 sa-gyō)	suu, swu sū	すう, すぅ すー	スウ, スゥ スー
Addition dakuten z- (ざ行 za-gyō)	zu	ず	ズ
Addition dakuten z- (ざ行 za-gyō)	zuu, zwu zū	ずう, ずぅ ずー	ズウ, ズゥ ズー

Other additional forms

Form A (sw-/sy-)
Romaji	Hiragana	Katakana
swa	すぁ, すゎ	スァ, スヮ
swi, si, syi	すぃ	スィ *
(swu)	すぅ	スゥ
swe	すぇ	スェ
swo	すぉ	スォ
sya	すゃ	スャ
syu	すゅ	スュ
sye	すぃぇ	スィェ
syo	すょ	スョ

Form B (zw-/zy-)
Romaji	Hiragana	Katakana
zwa	ずぁ, ずゎ	ズァ, ズヮ
zwi, zi, zyi	ずぃ	ズィ *
(zwu)	ずぅ	ズゥ
zwe	ずぇ	ズェ
zwo	ずぉ	ズォ
zya	ずゃ	ズャ
zyu	ずゅ	ズュ
zye	ずぃぇ	ズィェ
zyo	ずょ	ズョ

* スィ and ズィ are also used to present si and zi pronunciations respectively. For example, 'C' is presented as スィー /siː/. See also Hepburn romanization.

== Stroke order ==
Stroke order in writing す

2

Stroke order in writing ス

2

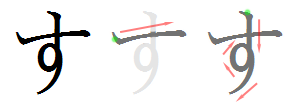
Stroke order in writing す

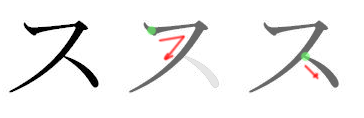
Stroke order in writing ス

== Other communicative representations ==
Japanese radiotelephony alphabet	Wabun code
すずめのス; Suzume no "Su"	▄▄▄ ▄▄▄ ▄▄▄ ▄ ▄▄▄

Japanese Navy Signal Flag

Japanese semaphore
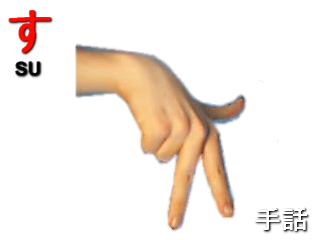
Japanese manual syllabary (fingerspelling)
Braille dots-1456
Japanese Braille

=== Braille forms ===
す / ス in Japanese Braille
す / ス su	ず / ズ zu	すう / スー sū	ずう / ズー zū	Other kana based on Braille す			
す / ス su	ず / ズ zu	すう / スー sū	ずう / ズー zū	しゅ / シュ shu	じゅ / ジュ ju	しゅう / シュー shū	じゅう / ジュー jū
⠹ (braille pattern dots-1456)	⠐ (braille pattern dots-5) ⠹ (braille pattern dots-1456)	⠹ (braille pattern dots-1456) ⠒ (braille pattern dots-25)	⠐ (braille pattern dots-5) ⠹ (braille pattern dots-1456) ⠒ (braille pattern dots-25)	⠈ (braille pattern dots-4) ⠹ (braille pattern dots-1456)	⠘ (braille pattern dots-45) ⠹ (braille pattern dots-1456)	⠈ (braille pattern dots-4) ⠹ (braille pattern dots-1456) ⠒ (braille pattern dots-25)	⠘ (braille pattern dots-45) ⠹ (braille pattern dots-1456) ⠒ (braille pattern dots-25)

=== Computer encodings ===
Character information
Preview	す		ス		ｽ		㋜	
Unicode name	HIRAGANA LETTER SU		KATAKANA LETTER SU		HALFWIDTH KATAKANA LETTER SU		CIRCLED KATAKANA SU	
Encodings	decimal	hex	dec	hex	dec	hex	dec	hex
Unicode	12377	U+3059	12473	U+30B9	65405	U+FF7D	13020	U+32DC
UTF-8	227 129 153	E3 81 99	227 130 185	E3 82 B9	239 189 189	EF BD BD	227 139 156	E3 8B 9C
Numeric character reference	&#12377;	&#x3059;	&#12473;	&#x30B9;	&#65405;	&#xFF7D;	&#13020;	&#x32DC;
Shift JIS	130 183	82 B7	131 88	83 58	189	BD		
EUC-JP	164 185	A4 B9	165 185	A5 B9	142 189	8E BD		
GB 18030	164 185	A4 B9	165 185	A5 B9	132 49 152 53	84 31 98 35		
EUC-KR / UHC	170 185	AA B9	171 185	AB B9				
Big5 (non-ETEN kana)	198 189	C6 BD	199 81	C7 51				
Big5 (ETEN / HKSCS)	199 64	C7 40	199 181	C7 B5				

Character information
Preview	ㇲ		ず		ズ	
Unicode name	KATAKANA LETTER SMALL SU		HIRAGANA LETTER ZU		KATAKANA LETTER ZU	
Encodings	decimal	hex	dec	hex	dec	hex
Unicode	12786	U+31F2	12378	U+305A	12474	U+30BA
UTF-8	227 135 178	E3 87 B2	227 129 154	E3 81 9A	227 130 186	E3 82 BA
Numeric character reference	&#12786;	&#x31F2;	&#12378;	&#x305A;	&#12474;	&#x30BA;
Shift JIS (plain)			130 184	82 B8	131 89	83 59
Shift JIS-2004	131 238	83 EE	130 184	82 B8	131 89	83 59
EUC-JP (plain)			164 186	A4 BA	165 186	A5 BA
EUC-JIS-2004	166 240	A6 F0	164 186	A4 BA	165 186	A5 BA
GB 18030	129 57 188 54	81 39 BC 36	164 186	A4 BA	165 186	A5 BA
EUC-KR / UHC			170 186	AA BA	171 186	AB BA
Big5 (non-ETEN kana)			198 190	C6 BE	199 82	C7 52
Big5 (ETEN / HKSCS)			199 65	C7 41	199 182	C7 B6
