= Georgian (Unicode block) =

- Range: U+10A0..U+10FF (96 code points)
- Plane: BMP
- Scripts: Georgian (87 char.); Common (1 char.)
- Major alphabets: Mkhedruli; Asomtavruli
- Assigned: 88 code points
- Unused: 8 reserved code points

Unicode version history
- 1.0.0 (1991): 78 (+78)
- 3.2 (2002): 80 (+2)
- 4.1 (2005): 83 (+3)
- 6.1 (2012): 88 (+5)

Unicode documentation
- Code chart ∣ Web page

Georgian is a Unicode block containing the Mkhedruli and Asomtavruli Georgian characters used to write Modern Georgian, Svan, and Mingrelian languages. Another lower case, Nuskhuri, is encoded in a separate Georgian Supplement block, which is used with the Asomtavruli to write the ecclesiastical Khutsuri Georgian script.

Mtavruli, large versions of Mkhedruli used in all-caps text, are found in the Georgian Extended block, although Georgian is generally unicameral and both upper cases are nonstandard.

== Block ==
Georgian^{[1]}^{[2]} Official Unicode Consortium code chart (PDF)
	0	1	2	3	4	5	6	7	8	9	A	B	C	D	E	F
U+10Ax	Ⴀ	Ⴁ	Ⴂ	Ⴃ	Ⴄ	Ⴅ	Ⴆ	Ⴇ	Ⴈ	Ⴉ	Ⴊ	Ⴋ	Ⴌ	Ⴍ	Ⴎ	Ⴏ
U+10Bx	Ⴐ	Ⴑ	Ⴒ	Ⴓ	Ⴔ	Ⴕ	Ⴖ	Ⴗ	Ⴘ	Ⴙ	Ⴚ	Ⴛ	Ⴜ	Ⴝ	Ⴞ	Ⴟ
U+10Cx	Ⴠ	Ⴡ	Ⴢ	Ⴣ	Ⴤ	Ⴥ		Ⴧ						Ⴭ		
U+10Dx	ა	ბ	გ	დ	ე	ვ	ზ	თ	ი	კ	ლ	მ	ნ	ო	პ	ჟ
U+10Ex	რ	ს	ტ	უ	ფ	ქ	ღ	ყ	შ	ჩ	ც	ძ	წ	ჭ	ხ	ჯ
U+10Fx	ჰ	ჱ	ჲ	ჳ	ჴ	ჵ	ჶ	ჷ	ჸ	ჹ	ჺ	჻	ჼ	ჽ	ჾ	ჿ
Notes 1.As of Unicode version 17.0 2.Grey areas indicate non-assigned code points

== History ==
The following Unicode-related documents record the purpose and process of defining specific characters in the Georgian block:

Version	Final code points (Note: Proposed code points and characters names may differ from final code points and names)	Count	UTC ID	L2 ID	WG2 ID	Document
1.0.0	U+10A0..10C5, 10D0..10F6, 10FB	78				(to be determined)
1.0.0	U+10A0..10C5, 10D0..10F6, 10FB	78	UTC/1999-017			Davis, Mark (1999-06-02), Data cross-checks (for Agenda)
1.0.0	U+10A0..10C5, 10D0..10F6, 10FB	78		L2/99-176R		Moore, Lisa (1999-11-04), "Data Cross-Checks", Minutes from the joint UTC/L2 meeting in Seattle, June 8-10, 1999
1.0.0	U+10A0..10C5, 10D0..10F6, 10FB	78		L2/01-040		Becker, Joe (2001-01-26), Unicode 3.1 Text: Encoding Model for Georgian Script
3.2	U+10F7..10F8	2		L2/00-404		Tarkhan-Mouravi, David (2000-10-30), Proposal for Asomtavruli, Nuskhuri, and Mkhedruli Georgian
3.2	U+10F7..10F8	2		L2/01-006		Moore, Lisa (2000-12-22), Reply to Georgian State Department of Information Technology
3.2	U+10F7..10F8	2		L2/01-046		Tarkhan-Mouravi, David (2001-01-22), Letter from the Georgian State department for Information Technology
3.2	U+10F7..10F8	2		L2/01-047		Megrelian and Svan Examples, 2001-01-22
3.2	U+10F7..10F8	2		L2/01-048		Proposal summary form for addition of 3 letters to the Georgian Mkhedruli block, 2001-01-22
3.2	U+10F7..10F8	2		L2/01-059		Everson, Michael (2001-01-24), Summary and proposed actions regarding the Georgian documents
3.2	U+10F7..10F8	2		L2/01-145	N2346R	Moore, Lisa (2001-04-03), Proposal to encode 2 Georgian characters in the UCS
3.2	U+10F7..10F8	2		L2/01-166		Moore, Lisa (2001-04-16), Reply to Georgian State Department of Information Technology
3.2	U+10F7..10F8	2		L2/01-012R		Moore, Lisa (2001-05-21), "Georgian", Minutes UTC #86 in Mountain View, Jan 2001
3.2	U+10F7..10F8	2		L2/01-227		Whistler, Ken (2001-05-22), "ITEM 1", WG2 Consent Docket for UTC #87
3.2	U+10F7..10F8	2		L2/01-184R		Moore, Lisa (2001-06-18), "Motion 87-M16, ITEM 1", Minutes from the UTC/L2 meeting
3.2	U+10F7..10F8	2		L2/01-344	N2353 (pdf, doc)	Umamaheswaran, V. S. (2001-09-09), "7.13", Minutes from SC2/WG2 meeting #40 -- Mountain View, April 2001
4.1	U+10F9..10FA, 10FC	3		L2/99-082	N1962	Everson, Michael (1999-02-26), Optimizing Georgian representation in the BMP of the UCS
4.1	U+10F9..10FA, 10FC	3		L2/00-115R2		Moore, Lisa (2000-08-08), Minutes Of UTC Meeting #83
4.1	U+10F9..10FA, 10FC	3		L2/03-230R2	N2608R2	Everson, Michael (2003-09-04), Proposal to add Georgian and other characters to the BMP of the UCS
6.1	U+10C7, 10CD, 10FD..10FF	5		L2/10-072	N3775	Everson, Michael (2010-03-09), Proposal for encoding Georgian and Nuskhuri letters for Ossetian and Abkhaz
6.1	U+10C7, 10CD, 10FD..10FF	5		L2/10-108		Moore, Lisa (2010-05-19), "Consensus 123-C7", UTC #123 / L2 #220 Minutes
6.1	U+10C7, 10CD, 10FD..10FF	5			N3803 (pdf, doc)	"M56.08i", Unconfirmed minutes of WG 2 meeting no. 56, 2010-09-24
