= Georgian Braille =

Braille system for the Georgian language

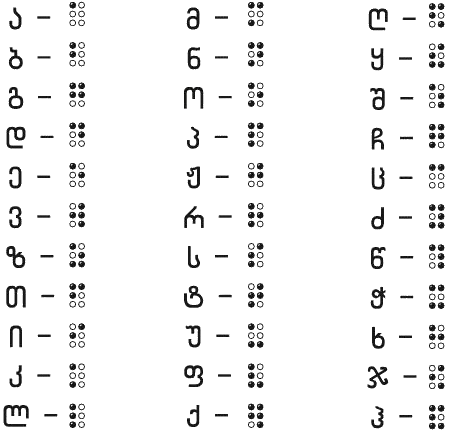
- Script type: Alphabet
- Print basis: Georgian alphabet
- Languages: Georgian

Related scripts
- Parent systems: Braille: Georgian Braille

Georgian Braille is a braille alphabet used for writing the Georgian language. The assignments of the Georgian Mkhedruli alphabet to braille patterns is largely consistent with unified international braille.

== Alphabet ==
⠁ ა a	⠃ ბ b	⠛ გ g	⠙ დ d	⠑ ე e	⠺ ვ v	⠵ ზ z	⠋ თ t’	⠊ ი i	⠅ კ k	⠇ ლ l
⠍ მ m	⠝ ნ n	⠕ ო o	⠏ პ p	⠚ ჟ zh	⠗ რ r	⠎ ს s	⠞ ტ t	⠥ უ u	⠧ ფ p’	⠻ ქ k’
⠫ ღ gh	⠮ ყ q	⠱ შ sh	⠟ ჩ ch’	⠉ ც ts’	⠽ ძ dz	⠹ წ ts	⠭ ჭ ch	⠓ ხ kh	⠪ ჯ dj	⠯ ჰ h

The basic braille range mostly conforms with international norms, with the exception of sounds which do not occur in Georgian, such as ⠋ *f (reassigned in Georgian to თ t’), and ⠟ *q, which is used for ჩ ch’ rather than ყ q. The assignment of ⠟ to ჩ ch’ is reminiscent of Russian Braille, as is one or two other letters (⠱ for შ sh is widespread in Eastern Europe), but most of the extended-letter assignments are unique to Georgian.

== Punctuation ==
Print	,	.	?	!	;	:	჻ ^{[*]}	„ ... “	( ... )
Braille	⠂ (braille pattern dots-2)	⠲ (braille pattern dots-256)	⠦ (braille pattern dots-236)	⠖ (braille pattern dots-235)	⠆ (braille pattern dots-23)	⠒ (braille pattern dots-25)	⠌ (braille pattern dots-34)	...	...

^* ჻ is an old word divider, no longer in use.

== See also ==
- International uniformity of braille alphabets
- Russian Braille
