= Patara Kartuli Anbani =

1914 book to teach Georgian

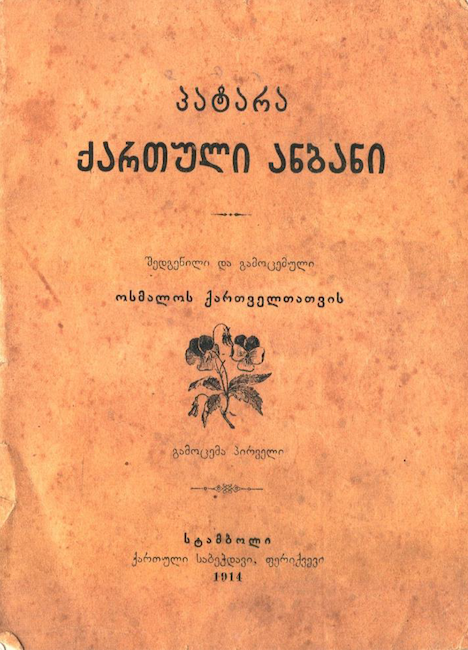
Patara Kartuli Anbani, 1914.

Patara Kartuli Anbani (Georgian: პატარა ქართული ანბანი) is a book which was published in Istanbul in 1914 to teach Georgians living in the Ottoman lands their language. The title of the book means "Little Georgian Alphabet" and is modeled on Georgian educator Iakob Gogebashvili's book Deda Ena.

== History ==
The opening of a Georgian school in Istanbul is linked to the presence of a Georgian community in this city. The roots of this community is traced to the Byzantine period. Following Russia's oppression of Catholic Georgians in the Georgian lands captured from the Ottomans in the 1828-1829 Ottoman-Russian War, Istanbul witnessed a new Georgian migration in the 1860s. A Georgian monastery was founded by Catholic Georgians under the leadership of Petre Kharischirashvili in the village of Feriköy in Istanbul where Georgian language education and publications were carried out. The idea of opening a separate school for Muslim Georgians, or "Ottoman Georgians", emerged among the Georgian intellectuals who met in this monastery. Subsequently, permission to open a school was obtained from the Ottoman government. Patara Kartuli Anbani was prepared and printed for this school. However, in the same year that the book was published, World War I broke out and the opening of the school could not be realized.

== Features ==
Patara Kartuli Anbani was the first textbook published in Turkey for the purpose of providing education in Georgian. On its cover, it was stated in Georgian that the "Little Georgian Alphabet was prepared and printed for the Ottoman Georgians. First Edition, Istanbul, Georgian Printing House, Feriköy, 1914" (პატარა ქართული ანბანი, შედგენილი და გამოცემული ოსმალოს ქართველთათვის, გამოცემა პირველი, სტამბოლი, ქართული საბეჭდავი, ფერიქვევი, 1914). It is understood from this statement that the book was prepared for Georgians living in the Ottoman lands and was printed in the Georgian Catholic Monastery printing house. The name of the person who prepared the book is not mentioned. However, it is stated in a Georgian source that this book was prepared by Memed Abashidze, who escaped from oppression and took refuge with his relatives in Istanbul and fought for Georgians living in Turkey to receive education in their own language.

Patara Kartuli Anbani is a short book of 16 pages and consists of two parts. The first part is divided into seven sections under the heading "Lesson" (გაკვეთილი). In these sections, letters of the Georgian alphabet and their pronunciation is taught. The second part consists of "Texts" (საკითხავი). There are eight short reading passages here. At the end of the book, the numbers are given one by one from 1 to 10, by tens from 10 to 100, and by hundreds from 100 to 1000. It is stated on the back cover of the book that the price is 40 para and that a more comprehensive textbook will be published with the proceeds from the sale.

== Georgian letters and their Ottoman equivalents ==
Because the Georgian language has different phonemes than Turkish, some of the Ottoman Turkish equivalences of Georgian letters were indicated with double letters. It was also stated that some phonemes should be pronounced "lightly" (حفیف) and others "heavily" (ثقیل). 33 letters, five vowels and 28 consonants are given in the introduction of the book. In a note at the end of the page, it is stated that four other letters are used in Georgian language.

Georgian alphabet	Ottoman alphabet	Notes
ა	آ	-
ბ	ب	-
გ	ک	-
დ	د	-
ე	.آ	-
ვ	و	-
ზ	ز	-
თ	ت	-
ი	ای	-
კ	ق	حفیف
ლ	ل	-
მ	م	-
ნ	ن	-
ო	او	ثقیل
პ	پ	ثقیل
ჟ	ژ	-
რ	ر	-
ს	س	-
ტ	ط	-
უ	او	حفیف
ფ	ف	-
ქ	ك	-
ღ	غ	-
ყ	ق	ثقیل
შ	ش	-
ჩ	چ	-
ც	ت س	-
ძ	دز	-
წ	دس	-
ჭ	دچ	-
ხ	خ	-
ჯ	ج	-
ჰ	ﻫ	-
