= Nari =

Nari may refer to:

== People ==
Given name:

- Nari (Korean name), including a list of people with the name
- Nari Contractor (born 1934), Indian cricketer
- Nari Gandhi (1934–1993), Indian architect
- Nari Hira, Indian film producer
- Nari Kusakawa, Japanese manga artist
- Nari Ward (born 1963), Jamaican artist
- Nari (poet), pen name of Kurdish poet Mela Kake Heme (1874–1944)

Surname:

- Marcela Nari (1965–2000), Argentine historian

== Places ==
- Nari district, Afghanistan
- Nari, India, a town
- Nari, Purba Bardhaman, a census town in West Bengal, India
- Nari, Razavi Khorasan, a village in Razavi Khorasan Province, Iran
- Nari, Urmia, a village in West Azerbaijan Province, Iran
- Nari, Silvaneh, a village in West Azerbaijan Province, Iran
- Nari, Mardan, Pakistan, a village
- Nari, Punjab, Pakistan a town in
- Na Ri District, a district in Vietnam

== Other uses ==
- Nari (son of Loki) or Narfi, a Norse god
- Typhoon Nari (disambiguation), four tropical cyclones
- Nari (creature), a creature featured in the game Legendary
- Palestinian Arabic name for caliche rock. See at Jerusalem stone.
- Nari (magazine), Nepalese monthly women's magazine
- Nari (kana), a ligature in Japanese writing
- Nari (letter), a letter in various Georgian alphabets
- Nari (film), a 1942 Bollywood film
- Nari (restaurant), a Michelin-starred restaurant in San Francisco, California
- Nari, an archaic Korean honorific used by common people towards people of higher rank

== See also ==
- NARI (disambiguation)
- Nadi (disambiguation)
- Nara (disambiguation)
- Naari (film), 1963 Indian Odia-language film
- Naree, 1992 Bengali-language book about feminism
- Nari-Nari, Indigenous Australian group in the Riverina region of New South Wales
- Nary (disambiguation)
