= NARI =

NARI may refer to:

- National Agricultural Research Institute (Eritrea), a semi autonomous unit of the Ministry of Agriculture in Eritrea
- Noradrenaline reuptake inhibitor, a class of drugs that affect the neurotransmitter Noradrenaline in the nervous system

== See also ==
- Nari (disambiguation)
