= Khari (letter) =

35th letter of the three Georgian scripts

- Ⴤ ⴤ ჴ Ჴ

Usage
- Writing system: Georgian script
- Type: Alphabetic
- Language of origin: Georgian language
- Sound values: [q⁽ʰ⁾], [χ]
- In Unicode: U+10C4, U+2D24, U+10F4, U+1CB4
- Alphabetical position: 35

History
- Time period: c. 430-19th century
- Transliterations: Q, Qʼ, H̱, X̣

Other
- Associated numbers: 7000
- Writing direction: Left-to-right

Khari, Hari, or Har (Asomtavruli: Ⴤ; Nuskhuri: ⴤ; Mkhedruli: ჴ; Mtavruli: Ჴ; Georgian: ჴარი, ჴარ) is the 35th letter of the three Georgian scripts.

In the system of Georgian numerals, it has a value of 7000. It represented the voiceless uvular (aspirated) plosive /q⁽ʰ⁾/. This letter is now obsolete due to it being replaced by the letter ხ (khani, a voiceless uvular fricative /χ/). It is typically romanized with the letter Q, Qʼ, H̱, or X̣.

== Letter ==
asomtavruli	nuskhuri	mkhedruli	mtavruli

=== Three-dimensional ===
asomtavruli

nuskhuri

mkhedruli

=== Stroke order ===
asomtavruli

== Computer encodings ==
Character information
Preview	Ⴤ		ⴤ		ჴ		Ჴ	
Unicode name	GEORGIAN CAPITAL LETTER HAR		GEORGIAN SMALL LETTER HAR		GEORGIAN LETTER HAR		GEORGIAN MTAVRULI CAPITAL LETTER HAR	
Encodings	decimal	hex	dec	hex	dec	hex	dec	hex
Unicode	4292	U+10C4	11556	U+2D24	4340	U+10F4	7348	U+1CB4
UTF-8	225 131 132	E1 83 84	226 180 164	E2 B4 A4	225 131 180	E1 83 B4	225 178 180	E1 B2 B4
Numeric character reference	&#4292;	&#x10C4;	&#11556;	&#x2D24;	&#4340;	&#x10F4;	&#7348;	&#x1CB4;

== See also ==
- Georgian letter Khani
- Georgian letter Q'ari

== Bibliography ==
- Mchedlidze, T. (1) The restored Georgian alphabet, Fulda, Germany, 2013
- Mchedlidze, T. (2) The Georgian script; Dictionary and guide, Fulda, Germany, 2013
- Machavariani, E. Georgian manuscripts, Tbilisi, 2011
- The Unicode Standard, Version 6.3, (1) Georgian, 1991–2013
- The Unicode Standard, Version 6.3, (2) Georgian Supplement, 1991–2013
