= Romanization of Georgian =

Transliteration of text from the Georgian script into the Latin script

Romanization of Georgian is the process of transliterating the Georgian language from the Georgian script into the Latin script.

== National system ==
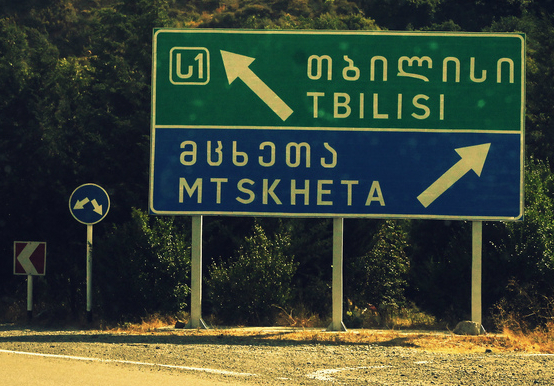
Mtskheta and Tbilisi romanized.

Georgian romanized in Dittionario giorgiano e italiano in 1629.

This system, adopted in February 2002 by the State Department of Geodesy and Cartography of Georgia and the Institute of Linguistics, Georgian National Academy of Sciences, establishes a transliteration system of the Georgian letters into Latin letters. The system was already in use, since 1998, on driving licenses. It is also used by BGN and PCGN since 2009, as well as in Google Translate.

== Unofficial system ==
Despite its popularity this system sometimes leads to ambiguity. The system is mostly used in social networks, forums, chat rooms, etc. The system is greatly influenced by the common QWERTY-derived Georgian keyboard layout that ties each key to each letter in the alphabet (seven of them: T, W, R, S, J, Z, C with the help of the shift key to make another letter).

== ISO standard ==
ISO 9984:1996, "Transliteration of Georgian characters into Latin characters", was last reviewed and confirmed in 2010. The guiding principles in the standard are:

- No digraphs, i.e. one Latin letter per Georgian letter (apart from the apostrophe-like "High comma off center" (ISO 5426), which is mapped to "Combining comma above right" (U+0315) in Unicode, for aspirated consonants, whereas ejectives are unmarked, e.g.: კ → k, ქ → k̕
- Extended characters are mostly Latin letters with caron (haček – ž, š, č̕, č, ǰ), with the exception of "g macron" ღ → ḡ. Archaic extended characters are ē, ō, and ẖ (h with line below).
- No capitalization, both as it does not appear in the original script, and to avoid confusion with claimed popular ad hoc transliterations of caron characters as capitals instead. (e.g. შ as S for š)

== Transliteration table ==
Letter	IPA	National system	BGN/PCGN	ISO 9984	ALA-LC	Unofficial system
ა	/ɑ/	a	a	a	a	a
ბ	/b/	b	b	b	b	b
გ	/ɡ/	g	g	g	g	g
დ	/d/	d	d	d	d	d
ე	/ɛ/	e	e	e	e	e
ვ	/v/	v	v	v	v	v
ზ	/z/	z	z	z	z	z
ჱ (Note: Archaic letters.)	/eɪ/		ey	ē	ē	é
თ	/tʰ/	t	t	t̕	tʻ	T (Note: These are influenced by aforementioned layout, and are preferred to avoid ambiguity, as an expressions: t, j, g, ch can mean two letters.) or t
ი	/i/	i	i	i	i	i
კ	/kʼ/	k'	k'	k	k	k
ლ	/l/	l	l	l	l	l
მ	/m/	m	m	m	m	m
ნ	/n/	n	n	n	n	n
ჲ	/i/, /j/		j	y	y	
ო	/ɔ/	o	o	o	o	o
პ	/pʼ/	p'	p'	p	p	p
ჟ	/ʒ/	zh	zh	ž	ž	J, zh or j
რ	/r/	r	r	r	r	r
ს	/s/	s	s	s	s	s
ტ	/tʼ/	t'	t'	t	t	t
ჳ	/w/			w	w	
უ	/u/	u	u	u	u	u
ფ	/pʰ/	p	p	p̕	pʻ	p or f
ქ	/kʰ/	k	k	k̕	kʻ	q or k
ღ	/ʁ/	gh	gh	ḡ	ġ	g, gh or R
ყ	/qʼ/	q'	q'	q	q	y (Note: Initially, the use of letter y for ყ is most probably due to their resemblance to each other.)
შ	/ʃ/	sh	sh	š	š	sh or S
ჩ	/t͡ʃ(ʰ)/	ch	ch	č̕	čʻ	ch or C
ც	/t͡s(ʰ)/	ts	ts	c̕	cʻ	c or ts
ძ	/d͡z/	dz	dz	j	ż	dz or Z
წ	/t͡sʼ/	ts'	ts'	c	c	w, c or ts
ჭ	/t͡ʃʼ/	ch'	ch'	č	č	W, ch or tch
ხ	/χ/	kh	kh	x	x	x or kh (rarely)
ჴ	/q/, /qʰ/		q'	ẖ	x̣	
ჯ	/d͡ʒ/	j	j	ǰ	j	j
ჰ	/h/	h	h	h	h	h
ჵ	/oː/			ō	ō	
