= Nadi (disambiguation) =

Nadi is a region in Fiji.

Nadi or NADI may refer to:

== People ==
- Aldo Nadi (1899–1965), Italian fencer
- Alireza Nadi (born 1980), Iranian volleyball player
- Jules Nadi (1872–1928), French politician
- Nedo Nadi (1894–1940), Italian fencer
- Yunus Nadi Abalıoğlu (1879–1945), Turkish journalist

== Acronyms ==
- Normenausschuß der deutschen Industrie (NADI), Standardisation Committee of German Industry, predecessor of Deutsches Institut für Normung (DIN)

== Other uses ==
- Nadi Bhd, Malaysian public company
- Nadi (yoga), subtle energy channels described in yoga and Tantra
- Nadi astrology, an Indian form of astrology
- Ñadi a soil type or phytogeographic zone in Chile

== See also ==
- Naddi, a village in India
- Nadhi, a 1969 Indian Malayalam-language film
- Nady (disambiguation)
- Nari (disambiguation)
