= Nady =

Nady may refer to:

- Nady, Arkansas
- Nady Systems, Inc., American company
- Nady, a surname
  - Ahmad Nady (born 1981), Egyptian political cartoonist, comic artist and activist
  - Jay Nady (born 1947), American boxing referee
  - Jeff Nady (born 1990), American football player
  - Xavier Nady (born 1978), American baseball player

== See also ==
- Nadi (disambiguation)
- Nađ, Serbian surname
- Nagy, Hungarian surname
- Donald Naddy (1917–2017), American politician
