= Georgian Supplement =

- Range: U+2D00..U+2D2F (48 code points)
- Plane: BMP
- Scripts: Georgian
- Major alphabets: Nuskhuri
- Assigned: 40 code points
- Unused: 8 reserved code points

Unicode version history
- 4.1 (2005): 38 (+38)
- 6.1 (2012): 40 (+2)

Unicode documentation
- Code chart ∣ Web page

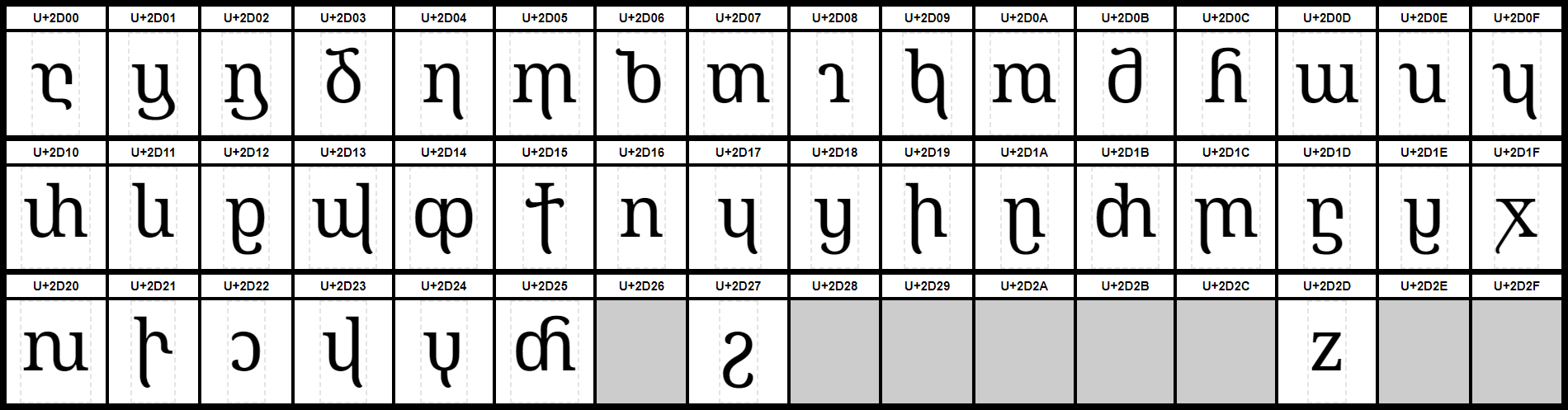
Graphical representation of the Georgian Supplement Unicode block

Georgian Supplement is a Unicode block containing characters for the ecclesiastical form of the Georgian script, Nuskhuri (Georgian: ნუსხური). To write the full ecclesiastical Khutsuri orthography, the Asomtavruli capitals encoded in the Georgian block.

== Block ==
Georgian Supplement^{[1]}^{[2]} Official Unicode Consortium code chart (PDF)
| | 0 | 1 | 2 | 3 | 4 | 5 | 6 | 7 | 8 | 9 | A | B | C | D | E | F |
| U+2D0x | ⴀ | ⴁ | ⴂ | ⴃ | ⴄ | ⴅ | ⴆ | ⴇ | ⴈ | ⴉ | ⴊ | ⴋ | ⴌ | ⴍ | ⴎ | ⴏ |
| U+2D1x | ⴐ | ⴑ | ⴒ | ⴓ | ⴔ | ⴕ | ⴖ | ⴗ | ⴘ | ⴙ | ⴚ | ⴛ | ⴜ | ⴝ | ⴞ | ⴟ |
| U+2D2x | ⴠ | ⴡ | ⴢ | ⴣ | ⴤ | ⴥ | | ⴧ | | | | | | ⴭ | | |
Notes: 1. As of Unicode version 17.0; 2. Grey areas indicate non-assigned code points

== History ==
The following Unicode-related documents record the purpose and process of defining specific characters in the Georgian Supplement block:

| Version | Final code points (Note: Proposed code points and characters names may differ from final code points and names) | Count | L2 ID | WG2 ID | Document |
|---|---|---|---|---|---|
| 4.1 | U+2D00..2D25 | 38 | | N1945-alt | Coding of GEORGIAN SMALL LETTERS (Nuskhuri), 1999-01-12 |
| 4.1 | U+2D00..2D25 | 38 | L2/99-082 | N1962 | Everson, Michael (1999-02-26), Optimizing Georgian representation in the BMP of the UCS |
| 4.1 | U+2D00..2D25 | 38 | L2/00-115R2 | | Moore, Lisa (2000-08-08), "Motion 83-M7", Minutes Of UTC Meeting #83 |
| 4.1 | U+2D00..2D25 | 38 | L2/00-404 | | Tarkhan-Mouravi, David (2000-10-30), Proposal for Asomtavruli, Nuskhuri, and Mkhedruli Georgian |
| 4.1 | U+2D00..2D25 | 38 | L2/01-006 | | Moore, Lisa (2000-12-22), Reply to Georgian State Department of Information Technology |
| 4.1 | U+2D00..2D25 | 38 | L2/01-046 | | Tarkhan-Mouravi, David (2001-01-22), Letter from the Georgian State department for Information Technology |
| 4.1 | U+2D00..2D25 | 38 | L2/01-059 | | Everson, Michael (2001-01-24), Summary and proposed actions regarding the Georgian documents |
| 4.1 | U+2D00..2D25 | 38 | L2/01-040 | | Becker, Joe (2001-01-26), Unicode 3.1 Text: Encoding Model for Georgian Script |
| 4.1 | U+2D00..2D25 | 38 | L2/01-072 | | Everson, Michael (2001-01-27), Georgian Text & Case Mappings, Reduxed |
| 4.1 | U+2D00..2D25 | 38 | L2/01-078 | | Letter from the "Catholicos Patriarch of all Georgia", 2001-01-29 |
| 4.1 | U+2D00..2D25 | 38 | L2/01-166 | | Moore, Lisa (2001-04-16), Reply to Georgian State Department of Information Technology |
| 4.1 | U+2D00..2D25 | 38 | L2/03-087 | | Tarkhan-Mouravi, David (2003-03-03), Georgian Unicode standard proposal |
| 4.1 | U+2D00..2D25 | 38 | L2/03-096 | | Everson, Michael (2003-03-04), Georgian |
| 4.1 | U+2D00..2D25 | 38 | L2/03-230R2 | N2608R2 | Everson, Michael (2003-09-04), Proposal to add Georgian and other characters to the BMP of the UCS |
| 6.1 | U+2D27, 2D2D | 2 | L2/10-072 | N3775 | Everson, Michael (2010-03-09), Proposal for encoding Georgian and Nuskhuri letters for Ossetian and Abkhaz |
| 6.1 | U+2D27, 2D2D | 2 | L2/10-108 | | Moore, Lisa (2010-05-19), "Consensus 123-C7", UTC #123 / L2 #220 Minutes |
| 6.1 | U+2D27, 2D2D | 2 | | N3803 (pdf, doc) | "M56.08i", Unconfirmed minutes of WG 2 meeting no. 56, 2010-09-24 |
