= National Agricultural Research Institute (Eritrea) =

Government institute in Eritrea

The National Agricultural Research Institute (NARI) is an agency within the Ministry of Agriculture of Eritrea, established in 2003. The institute was previously known as the Department of Agricultural Research and Human Resources Development (DARHARD).

== Divisions and units ==
Divisions

- Animal Resources Research
- Crop Development Research
- Natural Resources Management Research
- Agricultural Engineering Research
- Human Resources Development and Training

Units

- Socio Economics Unit
- Planning and Statistics Unit
- Communication and Public Relations Unit

== Management ==
- Dr. Iyassu Ghebretatios, Director General of NARI

== See also ==
- Eritrea Institute of Technology
