= X̣ =

Latin letter X with dot below

X̣ (minuscule: x̣) is a letter of the Latin alphabet, taken from an X with a dot below the letter. It is hard to render in computers because it is not used in the most common languages. It is used in many First Nations languages of the Pacific Northwest including Nuu-chah-nulth, Nłeʔkepmxcin/Nlha7kápmx (Thompson), and Chinook Jargon (Chinuk Wawa).
