= Tsani =

30th letter of the three Georgian scripts

- Ⴚ ⴚ ც Ც

Usage
- Writing system: Georgian script
- Type: Alphabetic
- Language of origin: Georgian language
- Sound values: [ts⁽ʰ⁾]
- In Unicode: U+10BA, U+2D1A, U+10EA, U+1CAA
- Alphabetical position: 30

History
- Time period: c. 430 to present
- Transliterations: Ts, Ts’, C, C’, C‘

Other
- Associated numbers: 2000
- Writing direction: Left-to-right

Tsani, or Tsan (Asomtavruli: Ⴚ; Nuskhuri: ⴚ; Mkhedruli: ც; Mtavruli: Ც; Georgian: ცანი, ცან) is the 30th letter of the three Georgian scripts.

In the system of Georgian numerals, it has a value of 2000. Tsani commonly represents the voiceless alveolar (aspirated) affricate /ts⁽ʰ⁾/, like the pronunciation of ⟨ts⟩ in "cats". It is typically romanized with the digraphs Ts, and Ts’, or with the letters C, C’, and C‘.

== Letter ==
asomtavruli	nuskhuri	mkhedruli	mtavruli

=== Three-dimensional ===
asomtavruli

nuskhuri

mkhedruli

=== Stroke order ===
asomtavruli

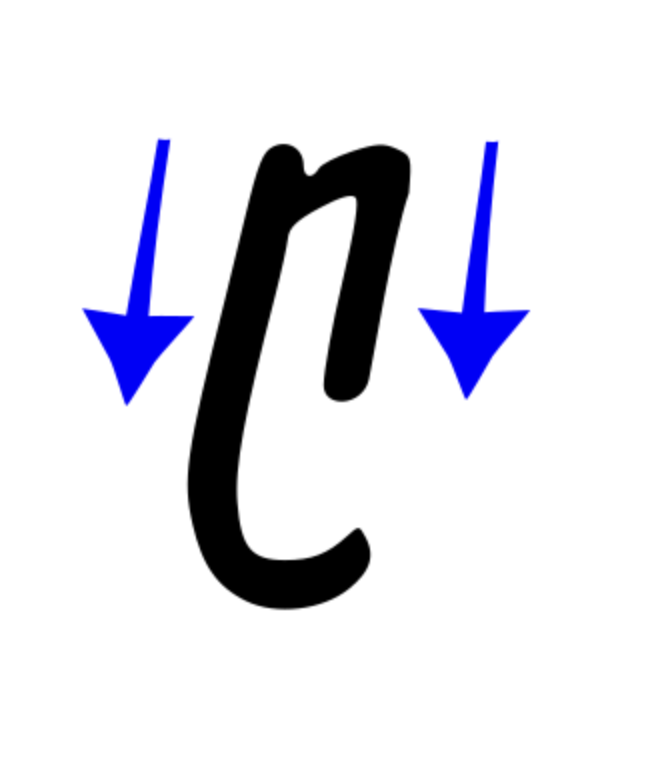
nuskhuri

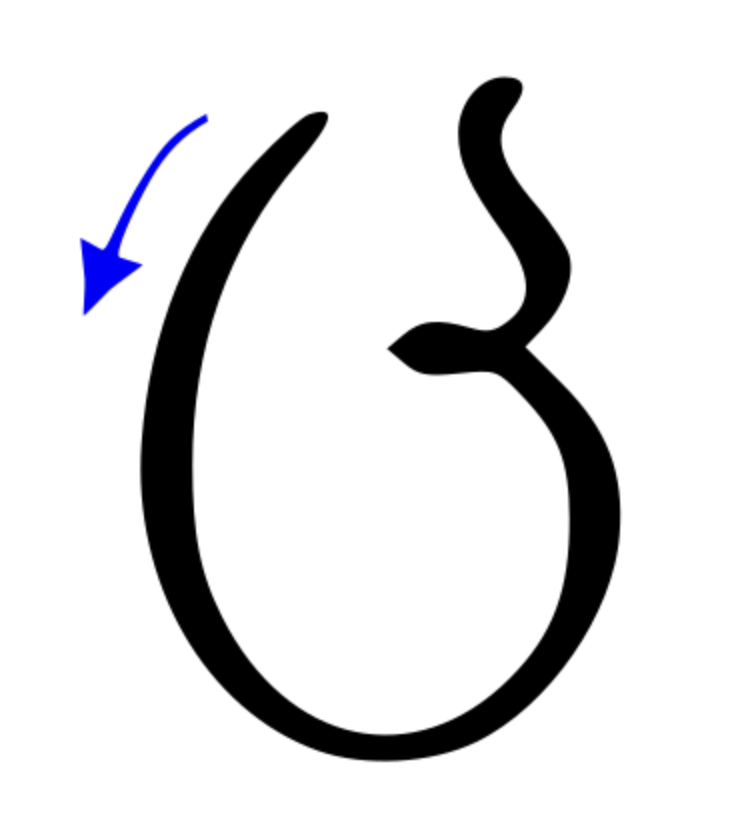
mkhedruli

== Computer encodings ==
Character information
Preview	Ⴚ		ⴚ		ც		Ც	
Unicode name	GEORGIAN CAPITAL LETTER CAN		GEORGIAN SMALL LETTER CAN		GEORGIAN LETTER CAN		GEORGIAN MTAVRULI CAPITAL LETTER CAN	
Encodings	decimal	hex	dec	hex	dec	hex	dec	hex
Unicode	4282	U+10BA	11546	U+2D1A	4330	U+10EA	7338	U+1CAA
UTF-8	225 130 186	E1 82 BA	226 180 154	E2 B4 9A	225 131 170	E1 83 AA	225 178 170	E1 B2 AA
Numeric character reference	&#4282;	&#x10BA;	&#11546;	&#x2D1A;	&#4330;	&#x10EA;	&#7338;	&#x1CAA;

== Braille ==
mkhedruli

== See also ==
- Latin digraph Ts
- Latin letter C
- Cyrillic letter Tse

== Bibliography ==
- Mchedlidze, T. (1) The restored Georgian alphabet, Fulda, Germany, 2013
- Mchedlidze, T. (2) The Georgian script; Dictionary and guide, Fulda, Germany, 2013
- Machavariani, E. Georgian manuscripts, Tbilisi, 2011
- The Unicode Standard, Version 6.3, (1) Georgian, 1991-2013
- The Unicode Standard, Version 6.3, (2) Georgian Supplement, 1991-2013
