= Zeni (letter) =

7th letter of the three Georgian scripts

- ზ ⴆ Ⴆ Ზ

Usage
- Writing system: Georgian script
- Type: Alphabetic
- Language of origin: Georgian language
- Sound values: [z]
- In Unicode: U+10A6, U+2D06, U+10D6, U+1C96
- Alphabetical position: 7

History
- Time period: c. 430 to present
- Transliterations: Z

Other
- Associated numbers: 7
- Writing direction: Left-to-right

Zeni, or Zen (Asomtavruli: Ⴆ; Nuskhuri: ⴆ; Mkhedruli: ზ Mtavruli: Ზ; Georgian: ზენი, ზენ) is the 7th letter of the three Georgian scripts.

In the system of Georgian numerals, it has a value of 7. Zeni commonly represents the voiced alveolar fricative /z/, like the pronunciation of ⟨z⟩ in "zebra". It is typically romanized with the letter Z.

== Letter ==
asomtavruli	nuskhuri	mkhedruli	mtavruli

=== Three-dimensional ===
asomtavruli

nuskhuri

mkhedruli

=== Stroke order ===
asomtavruli

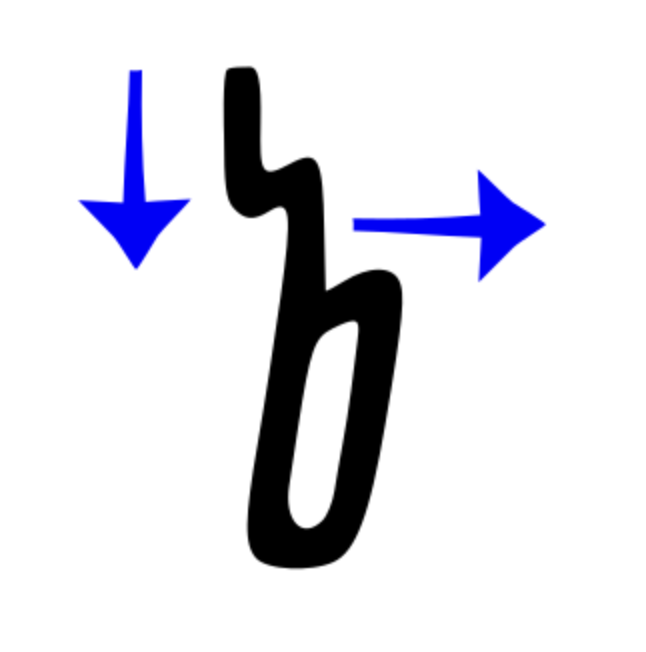
nuskhuri

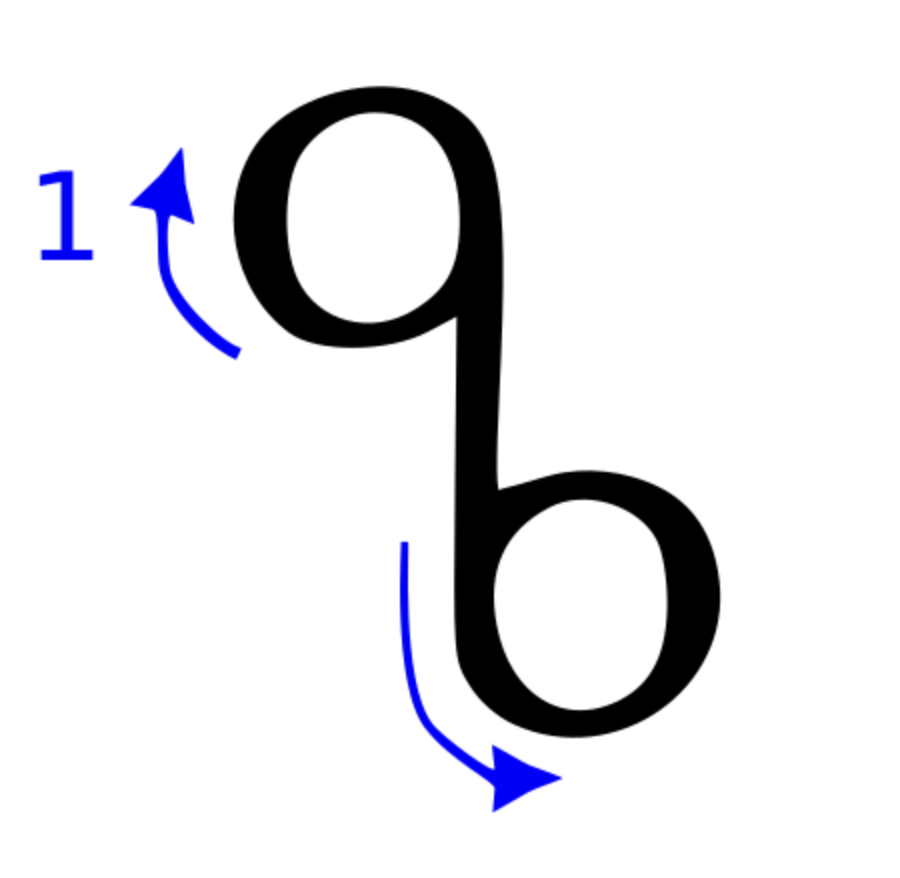
mkhedruli

== Computer encodings ==
Character information
Preview	Ⴆ		ⴆ		ზ		Ზ	
Unicode name	GEORGIAN CAPITAL LETTER ZEN		GEORGIAN SMALL LETTER ZEN		GEORGIAN LETTER ZEN		GEORGIAN MTAVRULI CAPITAL LETTER ZEN	
Encodings	decimal	hex	dec	hex	dec	hex	dec	hex
Unicode	4262	U+10A6	11526	U+2D06	4310	U+10D6	7318	U+1C96
UTF-8	225 130 166	E1 82 A6	226 180 134	E2 B4 86	225 131 150	E1 83 96	225 178 150	E1 B2 96
Numeric character reference	&#4262;	&#x10A6;	&#11526;	&#x2D06;	&#4310;	&#x10D6;	&#7318;	&#x1C96;

== Braille ==
mkhedruli

== See also ==
- Latin letter Z
- Cyrillic letter Ze

== Bibliography ==
- Mchedlidze, T. (1) The restored Georgian alphabet, Fulda, Germany, 2013
- Mchedlidze, T. (2) The Georgian script; Dictionary and guide, Fulda, Germany, 2013
- Machavariani, E. Georgian manuscripts, Tbilisi, 2011
- The Unicode Standard, Version 6.3, (1) Georgian, 1991-2013
- The Unicode Standard, Version 6.3, (2) Georgian Supplement, 1991-2013
