= Mani (letter) =

13th letter of the three Georgian scripts

- Ⴋ ⴋ მ Მ

Usage
- Writing system: Georgian script
- Type: Alphabetic
- Language of origin: Georgian language
- Sound values: [m]
- In Unicode: U+10AB, U+2D0B, U+10DB, U+1C9B
- Alphabetical position: 13

History
- Time period: c. 430 to present
- Transliterations: M

Other
- Associated numbers: 40
- Writing direction: Left-to-right

Mani, or Man (Asomtavruli: Ⴋ; Nuskhuri: ⴋ; Mkhedruli: მ; Mtavruli: Მ; Georgian: მანი, მან) is the 13th letter of the three Georgian scripts.

In the system of Georgian numerals, it has a value of 40. Mani commonly represents the voiced bilabial nasal /m/, like the pronunciation of ⟨m⟩ in "mine". It is typically romanized with the letter M.

== Letter ==
asomtavruli	nuskhuri	mkhedruli	mtavruli

=== Three-dimensional ===
asomtavruli

nuskhuri

mkhedruli

=== Stroke order ===
asomtavruli

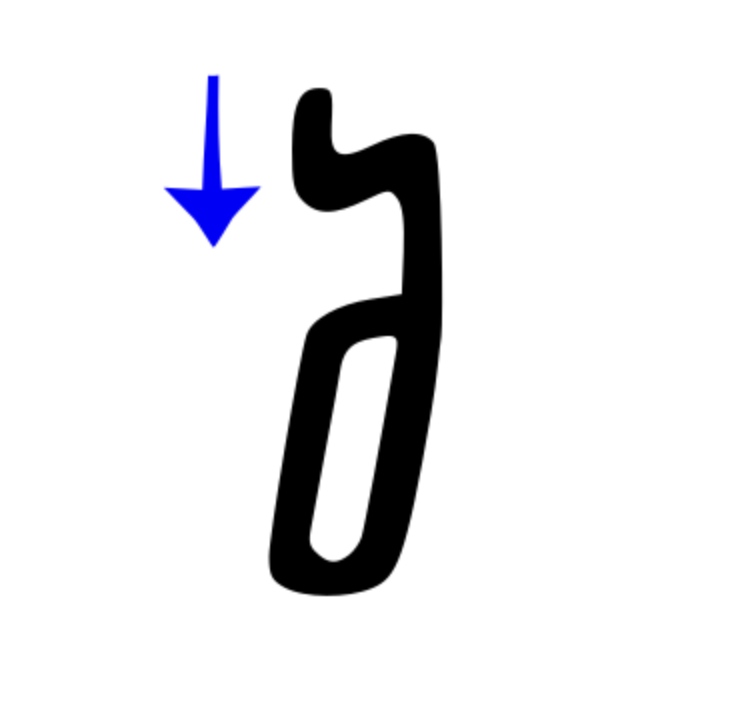
nuskhuri

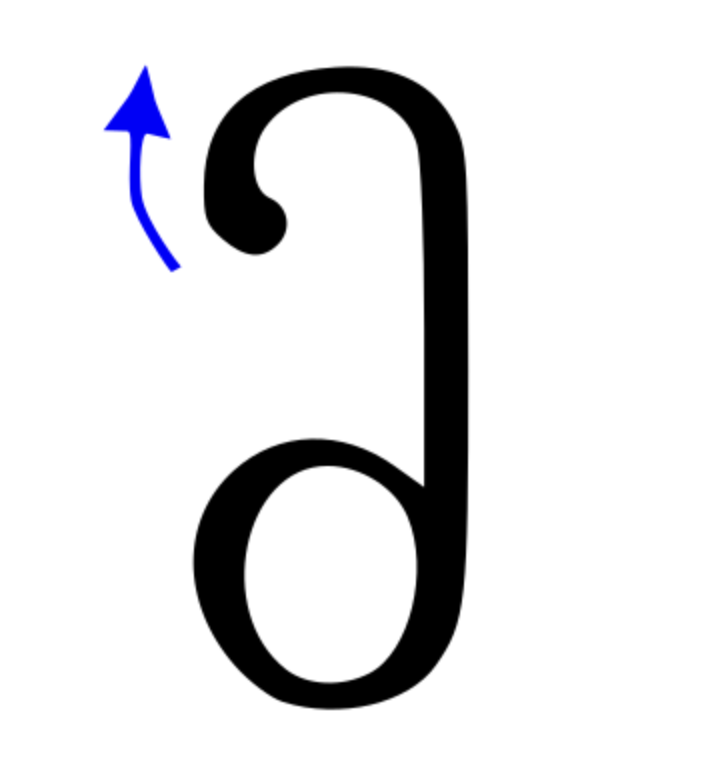
mkhedruli

== Computer encodings ==
Character information
Preview	Ⴋ		ⴋ		მ		Მ	
Unicode name	GEORGIAN CAPITAL LETTER MAN		GEORGIAN SMALL LETTER MAN		GEORGIAN LETTER MAN		GEORGIAN MTAVRULI CAPITAL LETTER MAN	
Encodings	decimal	hex	dec	hex	dec	hex	dec	hex
Unicode	4267	U+10AB	11531	U+2D0B	4315	U+10DB	7323	U+1C9B
UTF-8	225 130 171	E1 82 AB	226 180 139	E2 B4 8B	225 131 155	E1 83 9B	225 178 155	E1 B2 9B
Numeric character reference	&#4267;	&#x10AB;	&#11531;	&#x2D0B;	&#4315;	&#x10DB;	&#7323;	&#x1C9B;

== Braille ==
mkhedruli

== See also ==
- Latin letter M
- Cyrillic letter Em
- ∂, symbol

== Bibliography ==
- Mchedlidze, T. (1) The restored Georgian alphabet, Fulda, Germany, 2013
- Mchedlidze, T. (2) The Georgian script; Dictionary and guide, Fulda, Germany, 2013
- Machavariani, E. Georgian manuscripts, Tbilisi, 2011
- The Unicode Standard, Version 6.3, (1) Georgian, 1991-2013
- The Unicode Standard, Version 6.3, (2) Georgian Supplement, 1991-2013
