= Ani (letter) =

1st letter of the three Georgian scripts

- Ⴀ ⴀ ა Ა

Usage
- Writing system: Georgian script
- Type: Alphabetic
- Language of origin: Georgian language
- Sound values: [ä]
- In Unicode: U+10A0, U+2D00, U+10D0, U+1C90
- Alphabetical position: 1

History
- Time period: c. 430 to present
- Transliterations: A

Other
- Associated numbers: 1
- Writing direction: Left-to-right

Ani, or An (Asomtavruli: Ⴀ; Nuskhuri: ⴀ; Mkhedruli: ა; Mtavruli: Ა; Georgian: ანი, ან) is the 1st letter of the three Georgian scripts.

In the system of Georgian numerals, it has a value of 1. Ani represents the open central unrounded vowel /ä/, like the pronunciation of ⟨a⟩ in "father". It is typically romanized with the letter A.

The additional letters ა̈ (with an umlaut), ა̄ (with a macron) and ა̄̈ (with both an umlaut and macron) are used to write Svan as part of the modern Mkhedruli alphabet.

== Letter ==
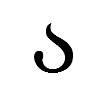
asomtavruli	nuskhuri	mkhedruli	mtavruli

=== Three-dimensional ===
asomtavruli

nuskhuri

mkhedruli

=== Stroke order ===
asomtavruli

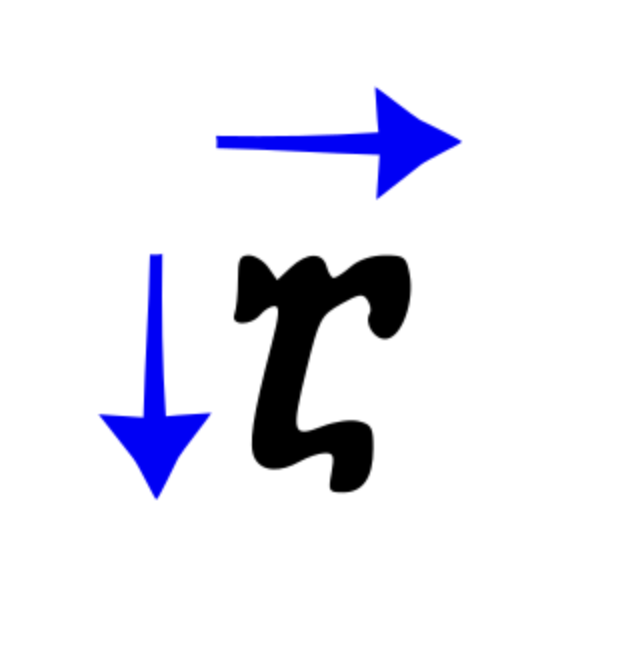
nuskhuri

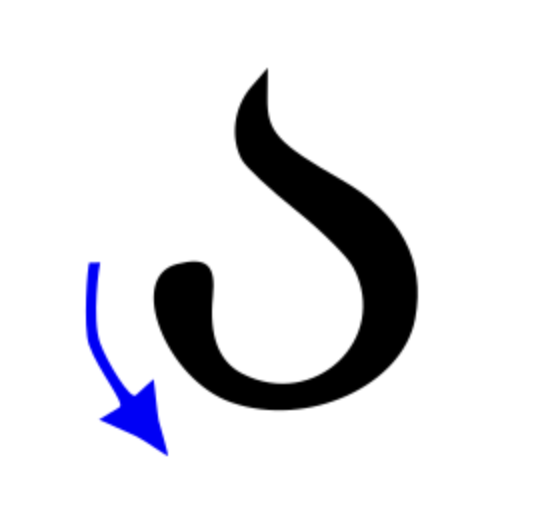
mkhedruli

=== Evolution ===
==== Evolution in Asomtavruli ====
asomtavruli
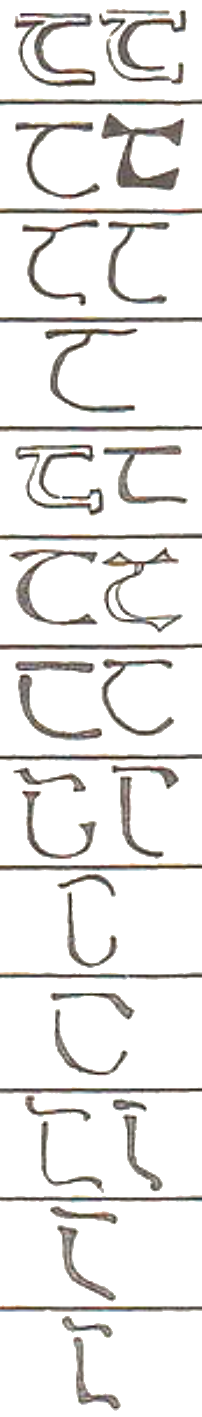

==== Evolution in all scripts ====
Ani evolution in all three scripts
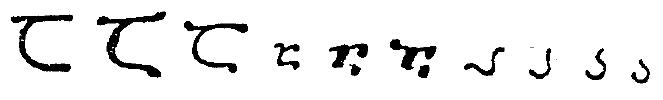

== Computer encodings ==
Character information
Preview	Ⴀ		ⴀ		ა		Ა	
Unicode name	GEORGIAN CAPITAL LETTER AN		GEORGIAN SMALL LETTER AN		GEORGIAN LETTER AN		GEORGIAN MTAVRULI CAPITAL LETTER AN	
Encodings	decimal	hex	dec	hex	dec	hex	dec	hex
Unicode	4256	U+10A0	11520	U+2D00	4304	U+10D0	7312	U+1C90
UTF-8	225 130 160	E1 82 A0	226 180 128	E2 B4 80	225 131 144	E1 83 90	225 178 144	E1 B2 90
Numeric character reference	&#4256;	&#x10A0;	&#11520;	&#x2D00;	&#4304;	&#x10D0;	&#7312;	&#x1C90;

== With diacritic ==
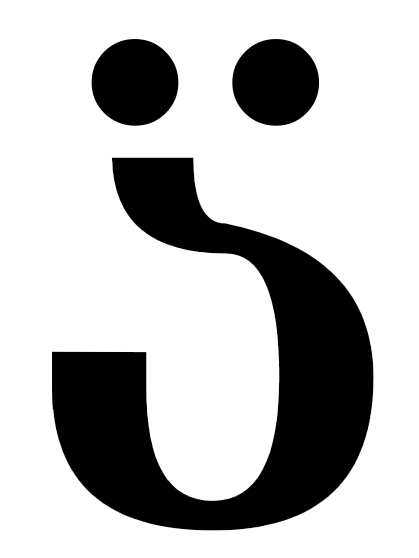
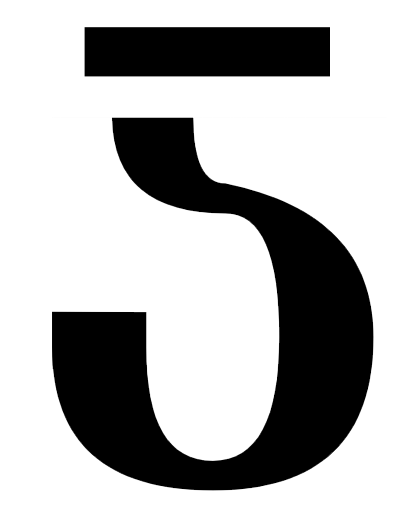
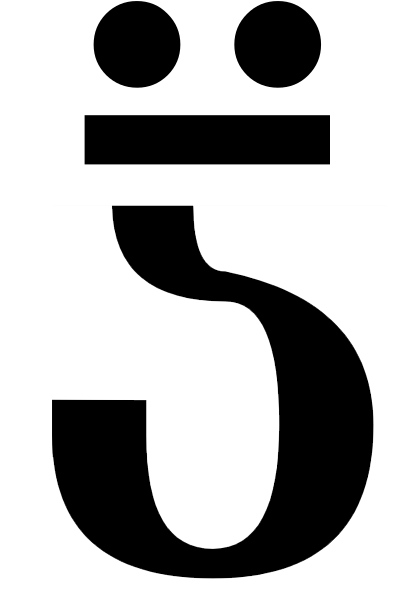
ა̈	ა̄	ა̄̈
U+10D0 U+0308	U+10D0 U+0304	U+10D0 U+0304 U+0308

== Braille ==
mkhedruli

== Related letters and other similar characters ==
- Latin letter A
- Cyrillic letter A
- Alpha, Greek letter

== Bibliography ==
- Mchedlidze, T. I, The restored Georgian alphabet, Fulda, Germany, 2013
- Mchedlidze, T. II, The Georgian script; Dictionary and guide, Fulda, Germany, 2013
- Machavariani, E. Georgian manuscripts, Tbilisi, 2011
- The Unicode Standard, Version 6.3, (1) Georgian, 1991-2013
- The Unicode Standard, Version 6.3, (2) Georgian Supplement, 1991-2013
