= Shini =

28th letter of the three Georgian scripts

- Ⴘ ⴘ შ Შ

Usage
- Writing system: Georgian script
- Type: Alphabetic
- Language of origin: Georgian language
- Sound values: [ʃ]
- In Unicode: U+10B8, U+2D18, U+10E8, U+1CA8
- Alphabetical position: 28

History
- Time period: c. 430 to present
- Transliterations: Sh, Š

Other
- Associated numbers: 900
- Writing direction: Left-to-right

Shini, or Shin (Asomtavruli: Ⴘ; Nuskhuri: ⴘ; Mkhedruli: შ; Mtavruli: Შ; Georgian: შინი, შინ) is the 28th letter of the three Georgian scripts.

In the system of Georgian numerals, it has a value of 900. Shini commonly represents the voiceless postalveolar fricative /ʃ/, like the pronunciation of ⟨sh⟩ in "shoe". It is typically romanized with the digraph Sh or with the letter Š.

== Letter ==
asomtavruli	nuskhuri	mkhedruli	mtavruli

=== Three-dimensional ===
asomtavruli

nuskhuri

mkhedruli

=== Stroke order ===
asomtavruli

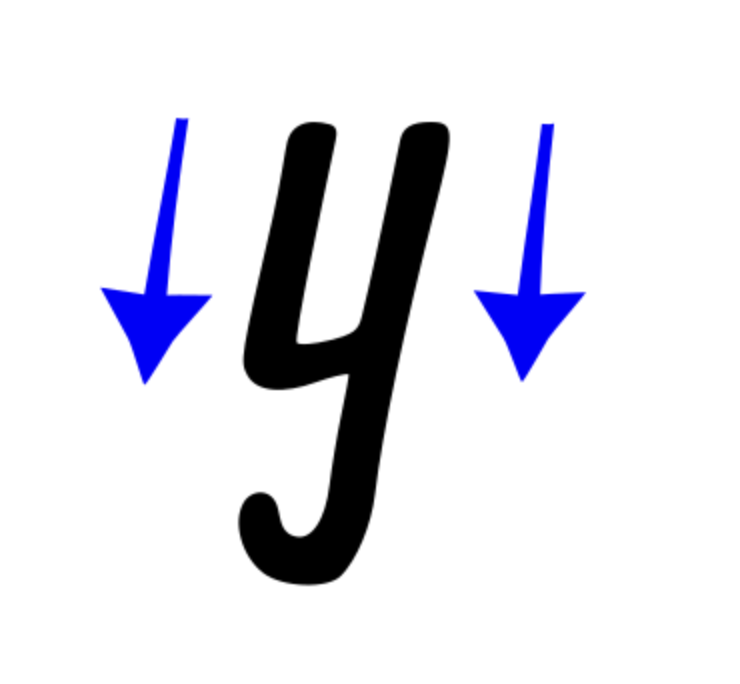
nuskhuri

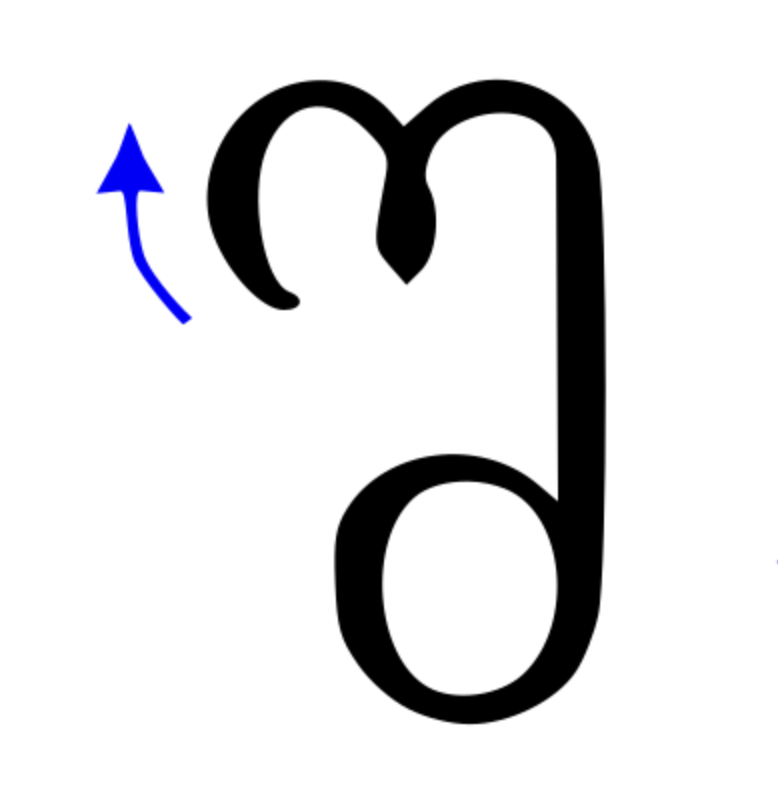
mkhedruli

== Computer encodings ==
Character information
Preview	Ⴘ		ⴘ		შ		Შ	
Unicode name	GEORGIAN CAPITAL LETTER SHIN		GEORGIAN SMALL LETTER SHIN		GEORGIAN LETTER SHIN		GEORGIAN MTAVRULI CAPITAL LETTER SHIN	
Encodings	decimal	hex	dec	hex	dec	hex	dec	hex
Unicode	4280	U+10B8	11544	U+2D18	4328	U+10E8	7336	U+1CA8
UTF-8	225 130 184	E1 82 B8	226 180 152	E2 B4 98	225 131 168	E1 83 A8	225 178 168	E1 B2 A8
Numeric character reference	&#4280;	&#x10B8;	&#11544;	&#x2D18;	&#4328;	&#x10E8;	&#7336;	&#x1CA8;

== Braille ==
mkhedruli

== See also ==
- Latin digraph Sh
- Latin letter Š
- Cyrillic letter Sha

== Bibliography ==
- Mchedlidze, T. (1) The restored Georgian alphabet, Fulda, Germany, 2013
- Mchedlidze, T. (2) The Georgian script; Dictionary and guide, Fulda, Germany, 2013
- Machavariani, E. Georgian manuscripts, Tbilisi, 2011
- The Unicode Standard, Version 6.3, (1) Georgian, 1991-2013
- The Unicode Standard, Version 6.3, (2) Georgian Supplement, 1991-2013
