= Chini (letter) =

29th letter of the three Georgian scripts

- Ⴙ ⴙ ჩ Ჩ

Usage
- Writing system: Georgian script
- Type: Alphabetic
- Language of origin: Georgian language
- Sound values: [tʃ⁽ʰ⁾]
- In Unicode: U+10B9, U+2D19, U+10E9, U+1CA9
- Alphabetical position: 29

History
- Time period: c. 430 to present
- Transliterations: Ch, Ch’, Č, Č’, Č‘

Other
- Associated numbers: 1000
- Writing direction: Left-to-right

Chini, or Chin (Asomtavruli: Ⴙ; Nuskhuri: ⴙ; Mkhedruli: ჩ; Mtavruli: Ჩ; Georgian: ჩინი, ჩინ) is the 29th letter of the three Georgian scripts.

In the system of Georgian numerals, it has a value of 1000. Chini commonly represents the voiceless postalveolar (aspirated) affricate /tʃ⁽ʰ⁾/, like the pronunciation of ⟨ch⟩ in "choose". It is typically romanized with the digraphs Ch, and Ch’, or with the letters Č, Č’, and Č‘.

== Letter ==
asomtavruli	nuskhuri	mkhedruli	mtavruli

=== Three-dimensional ===
asomtavruli

nuskhuri

mkhedruli

=== Stroke order ===
asomtavruli

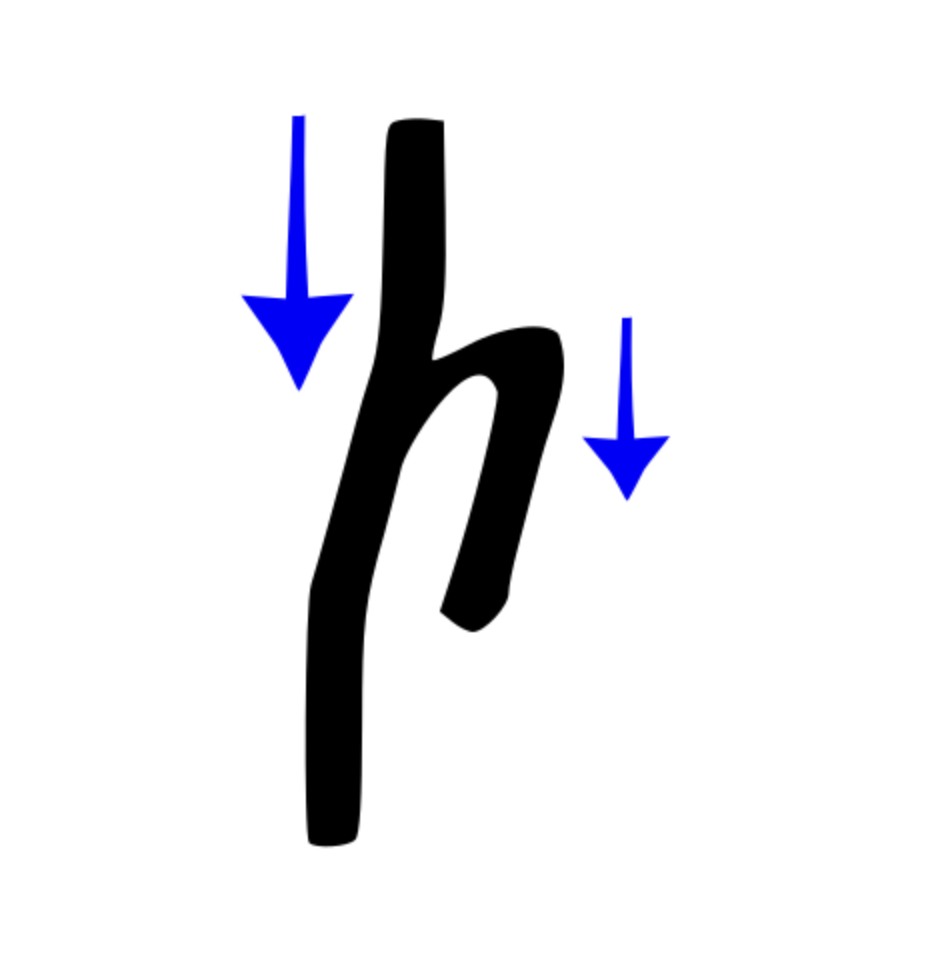
nuskhuri

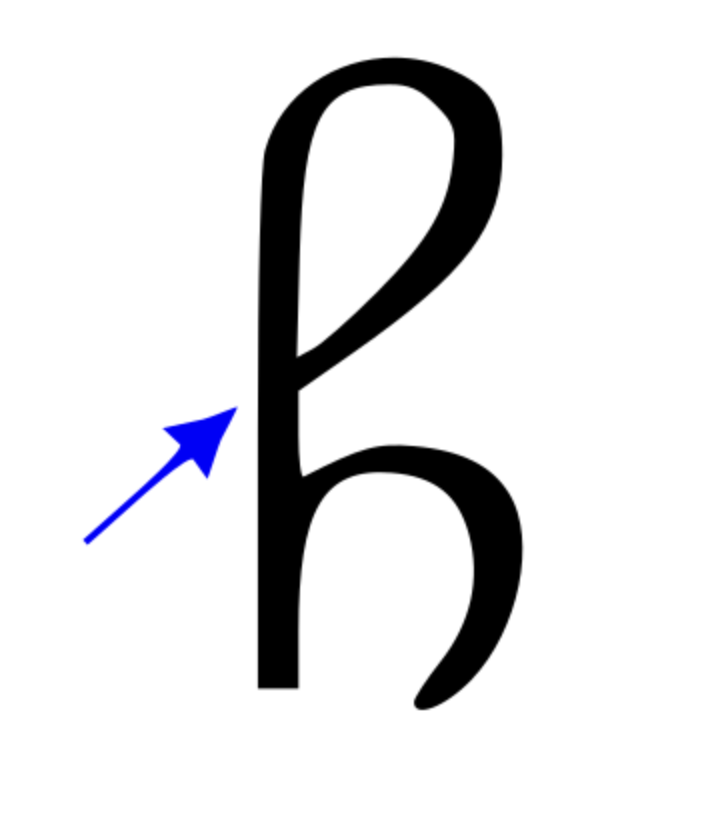
mkhedruli

== Computer encodings ==
Character information
Preview	Ⴙ		ⴙ		ჩ		Ჩ	
Unicode name	GEORGIAN CAPITAL LETTER CHIN		GEORGIAN SMALL LETTER CHIN		GEORGIAN LETTER CHIN		GEORGIAN MTAVRULI CAPITAL LETTER CHIN	
Encodings	decimal	hex	dec	hex	dec	hex	dec	hex
Unicode	4281	U+10B9	11545	U+2D19	4329	U+10E9	7337	U+1CA9
UTF-8	225 130 185	E1 82 B9	226 180 153	E2 B4 99	225 131 169	E1 83 A9	225 178 169	E1 B2 A9
Numeric character reference	&#4281;	&#x10B9;	&#11545;	&#x2D19;	&#4329;	&#x10E9;	&#7337;	&#x1CA9;

== Braille ==
mkhedruli

== See also ==
- Latin letter Ch
- Latin letter Č
- Cyrillic letter Che

== Bibliography ==
- Mchedlidze, T. (1) The restored Georgian alphabet, Fulda, Germany, 2013
- Mchedlidze, T. (2) The Georgian script; Dictionary and guide, Fulda, Germany, 2013
- Machavariani, E. Georgian manuscripts, Tbilisi, 2011
- The Unicode Standard, Version 6.3, (1) Georgian, 1991-2013
- The Unicode Standard, Version 6.3, (2) Georgian Supplement, 1991-2013
