= Bani (letter) =

Second letter of the three Georgian scripts

- Ⴁ ⴁ ბ Ბ

Usage
- Writing system: Georgian script
- Type: Alphabetic
- Language of origin: Georgian language
- Sound values: [b]
- In Unicode: U+10A1, U+2D01, U+10D1, U+1C91
- Alphabetical position: 2

History
- Time period: c. 430 to present
- Transliterations: B

Other
- Associated numbers: 2
- Writing direction: Left-to-right

Bani, or Ban (Asomtavruli: Ⴁ; Nuskhuri: ⴁ; Mkhedruli: ბ; Mtavruli Ბ; Georgian: ბანი, ბან) is the 2nd letter of the three Georgian scripts.

In the system of Georgian numerals, it has a value of 2. Bani commonly represents the voiced bilabial plosive /b/, like the pronunciation of ⟨b⟩ in "boy". It is typically romanized with the letter B.

== Letter ==
| asomtavruli | nuskhuri | mkhedruli | mtavruli |

=== Three-dimensional ===
asomtavruli

nuskhuri

mkhedruli

=== Stroke order ===
asomtavruli

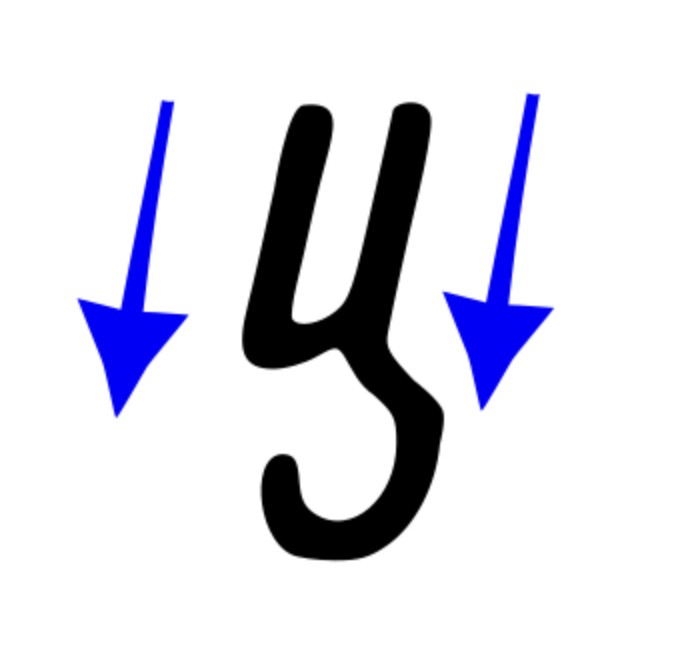
nuskhuri

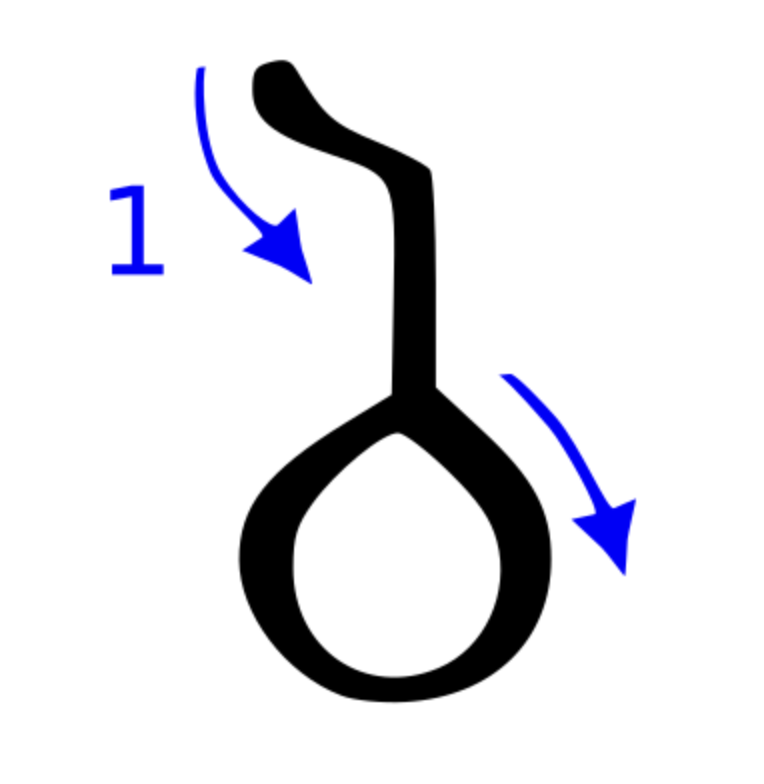
mkhedruli

== Computer encodings ==
Character information
| Preview | Ⴁ | | ⴁ | | ბ | | Ბ | |
|---|---|---|---|---|---|---|---|---|
| Unicode name | GEORGIAN CAPITAL LETTER BAN | | GEORGIAN SMALL LETTER BAN | | GEORGIAN LETTER BAN | | GEORGIAN MTAVRULI CAPITAL LETTER BAN | |
| Encodings | decimal | hex | dec | hex | dec | hex | dec | hex |
| Unicode | 4257 | U+10A1 | 11521 | U+2D01 | 4305 | U+10D1 | 7313 | U+1C91 |
| UTF-8 | 225 130 161 | E1 82 A1 | 226 180 129 | E2 B4 81 | 225 131 145 | E1 83 91 | 225 178 145 | E1 B2 91 |
| Numeric character reference | &#4257; | &#x10A1; | &#11521; | &#x2D01; | &#4305; | &#x10D1; | &#7313; | &#x1C91; |

== Braille ==
mkhedruli

== See also ==
- Greek letter Beta
- Latin letter B
- Cyrillic letter Be

== Bibliography ==
- Mchedlidze, T. (1) The restored Georgian alphabet, Fulda, Germany, 2013
- Mchedlidze, T. (2) The Georgian script; Dictionary and guide, Fulda, Germany, 2013
- Machavariani, E. Georgian manuscripts, Tbilisi, 2011
- The Unicode Standard, Version 6.3, (1) Georgian, 1991-2013
- The Unicode Standard, Version 6.3, (2) Georgian Supplement, 1991-2013
