= Zhani =

18th letter of the three Georgian scripts

- Ⴏ ⴏ ჟ Ჟ

Usage
- Writing system: Georgian script
- Type: Alphabetic
- Language of origin: Georgian language
- Sound values: [ʒ]
- In Unicode: U+10AF, U+2D0F, U+10DF, U+1C9F
- Alphabetical position: 18

History
- Time period: c. 430 to present
- Transliterations: Zh, Ž

Other
- Associated numbers: 90
- Writing direction: Left-to-right

Zhani, Zhan, or Zhar^{1} (Asomtavruli: Ⴏ; Nuskhuri: ⴏ; Mkhedruli: ჟ; Mtavruli: Ჟ; Georgian: ჟანი, ჟან) is the 18th letter of the three Georgian scripts.

In the system of Georgian numerals, it has a value of 90. Zhani commonly represents voiced palato-alveolar fricative /ʒ/, like the pronunciation of ⟨si⟩ in "vision". It is typically romanized with the digraph Zh or with the letter Ž.

== Letter ==
asomtavruli	nuskhuri	mkhedruli	mtavruli

=== Three-dimensional ===
asomtavruli

nuskhuri

mkhedruli

=== Stroke order ===
asomtavruli

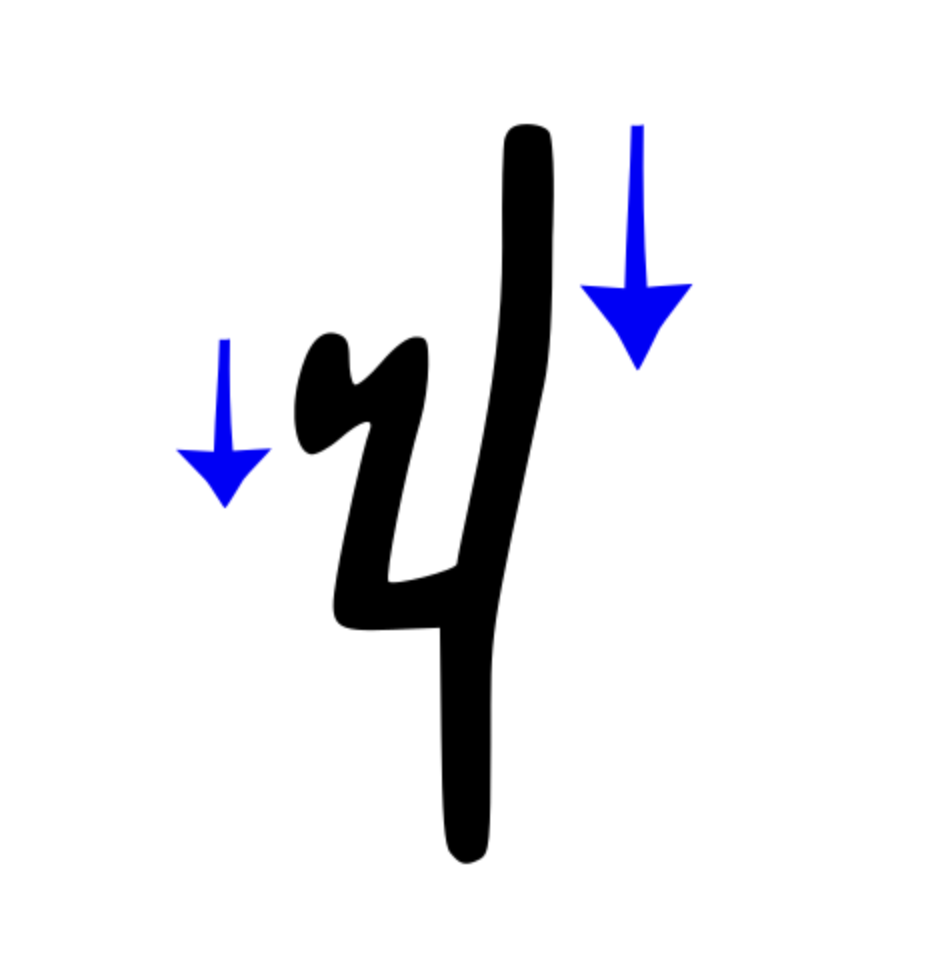
nuskhuri

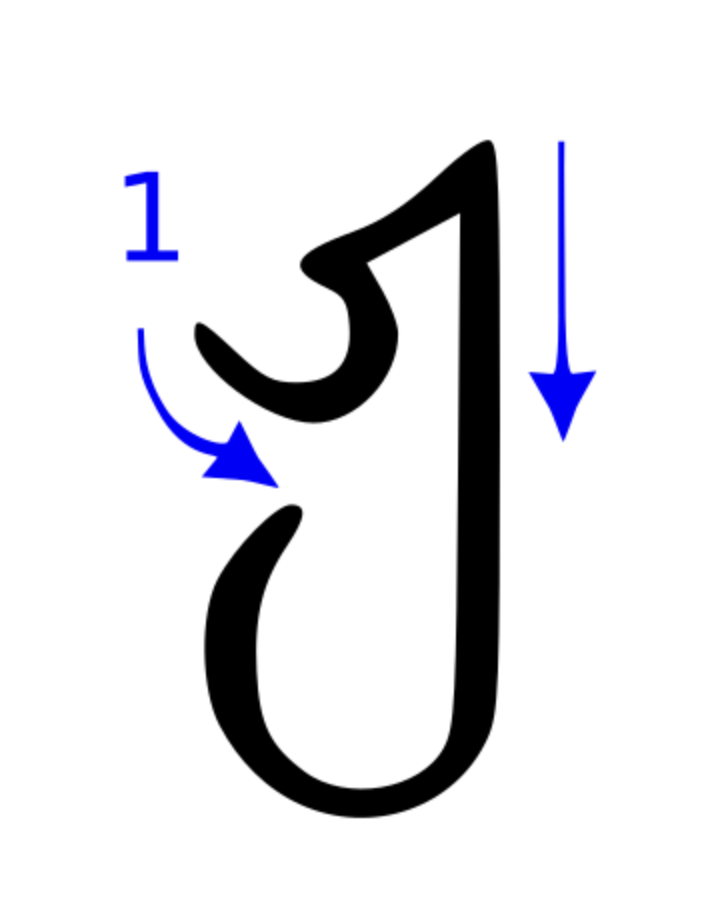
mkhedruli

== Computer encodings ==
Character information
Preview	Ⴏ		ⴏ		ჟ		Ჟ	
Unicode name	GEORGIAN CAPITAL LETTER ZHAR		GEORGIAN SMALL LETTER ZHAR		GEORGIAN LETTER ZHAR		GEORGIAN MTAVRULI CAPITAL LETTER ZHAR	
Encodings	decimal	hex	dec	hex	dec	hex	dec	hex
Unicode	4271	U+10AF	11535	U+2D0F	4319	U+10DF	7327	U+1C9F
UTF-8	225 130 175	E1 82 AF	226 180 143	E2 B4 8F	225 131 159	E1 83 9F	225 178 159	E1 B2 9F
Numeric character reference	&#4271;	&#x10AF;	&#11535;	&#x2D0F;	&#4319;	&#x10DF;	&#7327;	&#x1C9F;

== Braille ==
mkhedruli

== See also ==
- Latin letter Ž
- Cyrillic letter Zhe

== Notes ==
1. Unicode name of this letter

== Bibliography ==
- Mchedlidze, T. (1) The restored Georgian alphabet, Fulda, Germany, 2013
- Mchedlidze, T. (2) The Georgian script; Dictionary and guide, Fulda, Germany, 2013
- Machavariani, E. Georgian manuscripts, Tbilisi, 2011
- The Unicode Standard, Version 6.3, (1) Georgian, 1991-2013
- The Unicode Standard, Version 6.3, (2) Georgian Supplement, 1991-2013
