= Gani (letter) =

3rd letter of the three Georgian scripts

- Ⴂ ⴂ გ Გ

Usage
- Writing system: Georgian script
- Type: Alphabetic
- Language of origin: Georgian language
- Sound values: [g]
- In Unicode: U+10A2, U+2D02, U+10D2, U+1C92
- Alphabetical position: 3

History
- Development: 𓌙: 𐤂; Γ γ; Ⴂ ⴂ გ Გ
- Time period: c. 430 to present
- Transliterations: G

Other
- Associated numbers: 3
- Writing direction: Left-to-right

Gani, or Gan (Asomtavruli: Ⴂ; Nuskhuri: ⴂ; Mkhedruli: გ; Mtavruli: Გ; Georgian: განი, გან) is the 3rd letter of the three Georgian scripts.

In the system of Georgian numerals, it has a value of 3. Gani commonly represents the voiced velar plosive /ɡ/, like the pronunciation of ⟨g⟩ in "gun". It is typically romanized with the letter G.

== Letter ==
asomtavruli	nuskhuri	mkhedruli	mtavruli

=== Three-dimensional ===
asomtavruli

nuskhuri

mkhedruli

=== Stroke order ===
asomtavruli

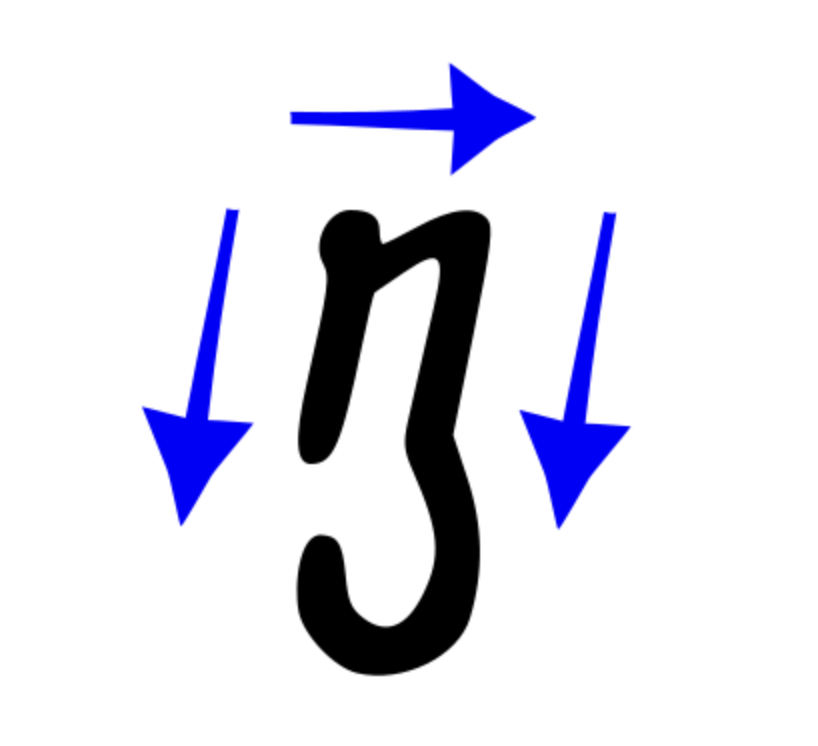
nuskhuri

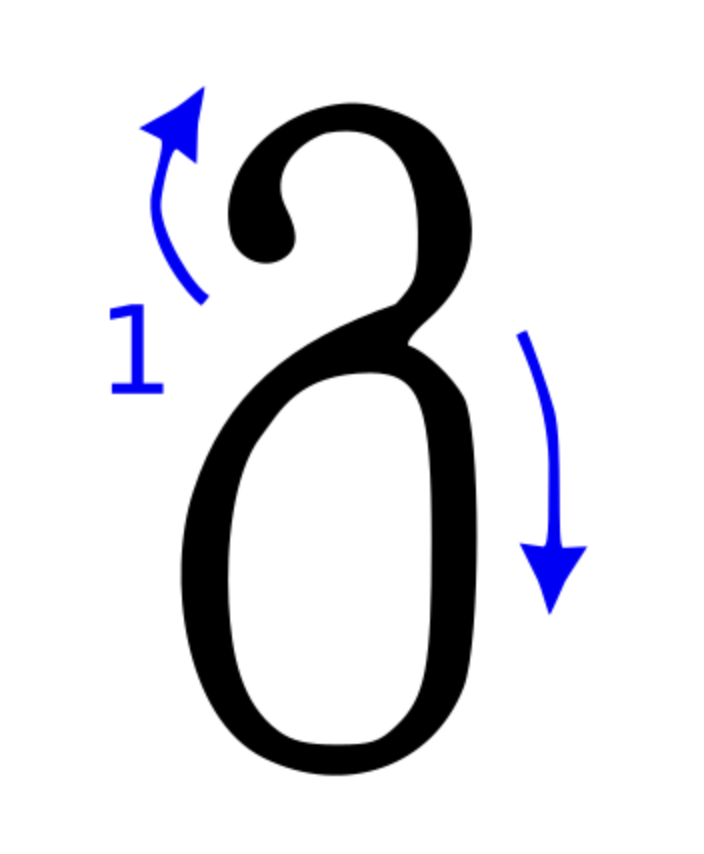
mkhedruli

== Computer encodings ==
Character information
Preview	Ⴂ		ⴂ		გ		Გ	
Unicode name	GEORGIAN CAPITAL LETTER GAN		GEORGIAN SMALL LETTER GAN		GEORGIAN LETTER GAN		GEORGIAN MTAVRULI CAPITAL LETTER GAN	
Encodings	decimal	hex	dec	hex	dec	hex	dec	hex
Unicode	4258	U+10A2	11522	U+2D02	4306	U+10D2	7314	U+1C92
UTF-8	225 130 162	E1 82 A2	226 180 130	E2 B4 82	225 131 146	E1 83 92	225 178 146	E1 B2 92
Numeric character reference	&#4258;	&#x10A2;	&#11522;	&#x2D02;	&#4306;	&#x10D2;	&#7314;	&#x1C92;

== Braille ==
mkhedruli

== See also ==
- Latin letter G
- Cyrillic letter Ge
- Greek letter Gamma

== Bibliography ==
- Mchedlidze, T. (1) The restored Georgian alphabet, Fulda, Germany, 2013
- Mchedlidze, T. (2) The Georgian script; Dictionary and guide, Fulda, Germany, 2013
- Machavariani, E. Georgian manuscripts, Tbilisi, 2011
- The Unicode Standard, Version 6.3, (1) Georgian, 1991-2013
- The Unicode Standard, Version 6.3, (2) Georgian Supplement, 1991-2013
