= Sani (letter) =

20th letter of the three Georgian scripts

- Ⴑ ⴑ ს Ს

Usage
- Writing system: Georgian script
- Type: Alphabetic
- Language of origin: Georgian language
- Sound values: [s]
- In Unicode: U+10B1, U+2D11, U+10E1, U+1CA1
- Alphabetical position: 20

History
- Time period: c. 430 to present
- Transliterations: S

Other
- Associated numbers: 200
- Writing direction: Left-to-right

Sani, or San (Asomtavruli: Ⴑ; Nuskhuri: ⴑ; Mkhedruli: ს; Mtavruli: Ს; Georgian: სანი, სან) is the 20th letter of the three Georgian scripts.

In the system of Georgian numerals, it has a value of 200. Sani commonly represents the voiceless alveolar fricative /s/, like the pronunciation of ⟨s⟩ in "see". It is typically romanized with the letter S.

== Letter ==
asomtavruli	nuskhuri	mkhedruli	mtavruli

=== Three-dimensional ===
asomtavruli

nuskhuri

mkhedruli

=== Stroke order ===
asomtavruli

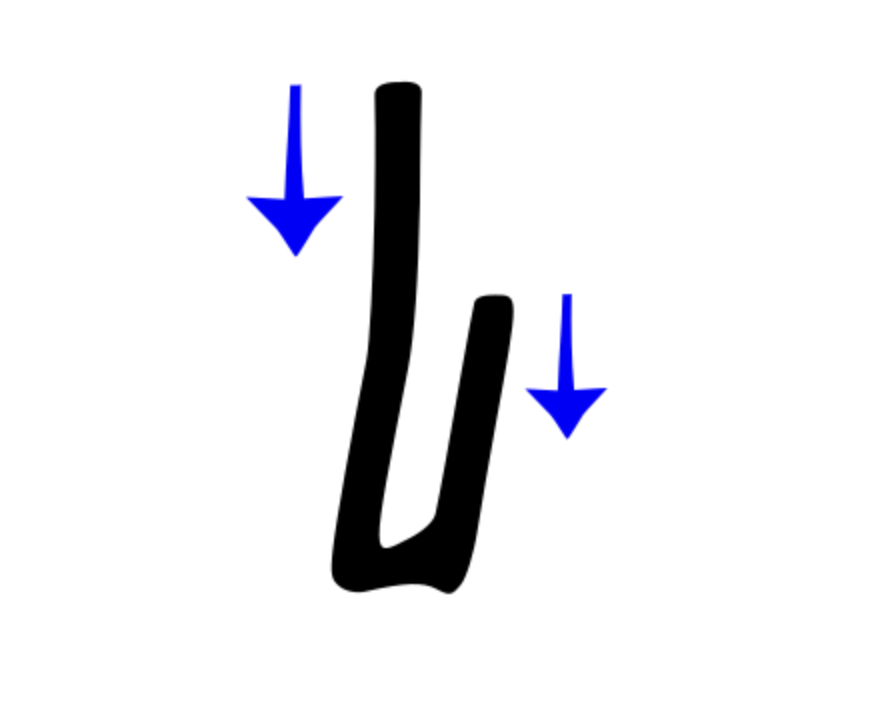
nuskhuri

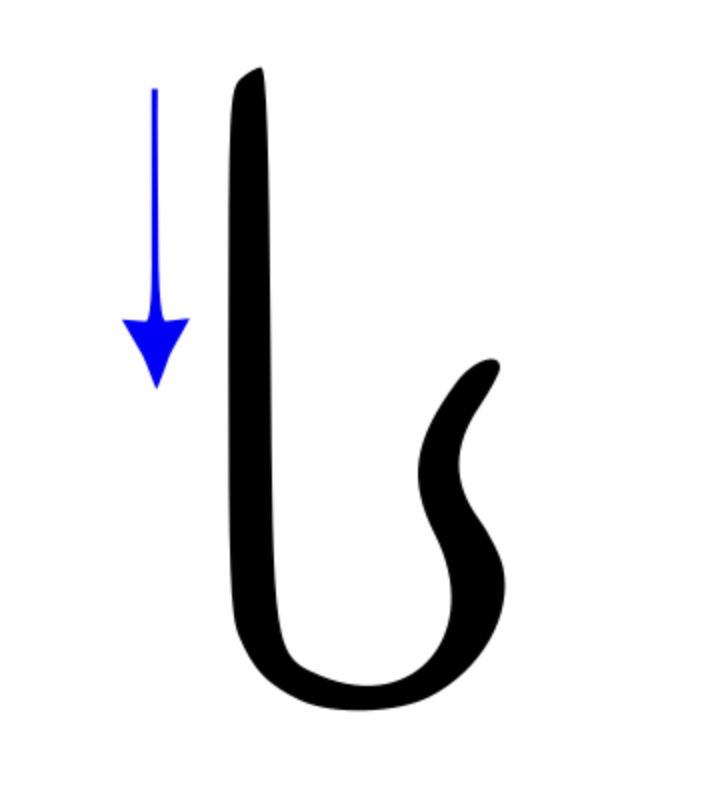
mkhedruli

== Computer encodings ==
Character information
Preview	Ⴑ		ⴑ		ს		Ს	
Unicode name	GEORGIAN CAPITAL LETTER SAN		GEORGIAN SMALL LETTER SAN		GEORGIAN LETTER SAN		GEORGIAN MTAVRULI CAPITAL LETTER SAN	
Encodings	decimal	hex	dec	hex	dec	hex	dec	hex
Unicode	4273	U+10B1	11537	U+2D11	4321	U+10E1	7329	U+1CA1
UTF-8	225 130 177	E1 82 B1	226 180 145	E2 B4 91	225 131 161	E1 83 A1	225 178 161	E1 B2 A1
Numeric character reference	&#4273;	&#x10B1;	&#11537;	&#x2D11;	&#4321;	&#x10E1;	&#7329;	&#x1CA1;

== Braille ==
mkhedruli

== See also ==
- Latin letter S
- Cyrillic letter Es

== Bibliography ==
- Mchedlidze, T. (1) The restored Georgian alphabet, Fulda, Germany, 2013
- Mchedlidze, T. (2) The Georgian script; Dictionary and guide, Fulda, Germany, 2013
- Machavariani, E. Georgian manuscripts, Tbilisi, 2011
- The Unicode Standard, Version 6.3, (1) Georgian, 1991-2013
- The Unicode Standard, Version 6.3, (2) Georgian Supplement, 1991-2013
