= Dzili =

31st letter of the three Georgian scripts

- Ⴛ ⴛ ძ Ძ

Usage
- Writing system: Georgian script
- Type: Alphabetic
- Language of origin: Georgian language
- Sound values: [d͡z]
- In Unicode: U+10BB, U+2D1B, U+10EB, U+1CAB
- Alphabetical position: 31

History
- Time period: c. 430 to present
- Transliterations: Dz, J, Ż, Ʒ

Other
- Associated numbers: 3000
- Writing direction: Left-to-right

Dzili, or Dzil (Asomtavruli: Ⴛ; Nuskhuri: ⴛ; Mkhedruli: ძ; Mtavruli: Ძ; Georgian: ძილი, ძილ) is the 31st letter of the three Georgian scripts.

In the system of Georgian numerals, it has a value of 3000. Dzili commonly represents the voiced alveolar affricate /dz/, like the pronunciation of ⟨ds⟩ in "pads". It is typically romanized with the digraph Dz, or with the letters J, Ż, and Ʒ.

== Letter ==
asomtavruli	nuskhuri	mkhedruli	mtavruli

=== Three-dimensional ===
asomtavruli

nuskhuri

mkhedruli

=== Stroke order ===
asomtavruli

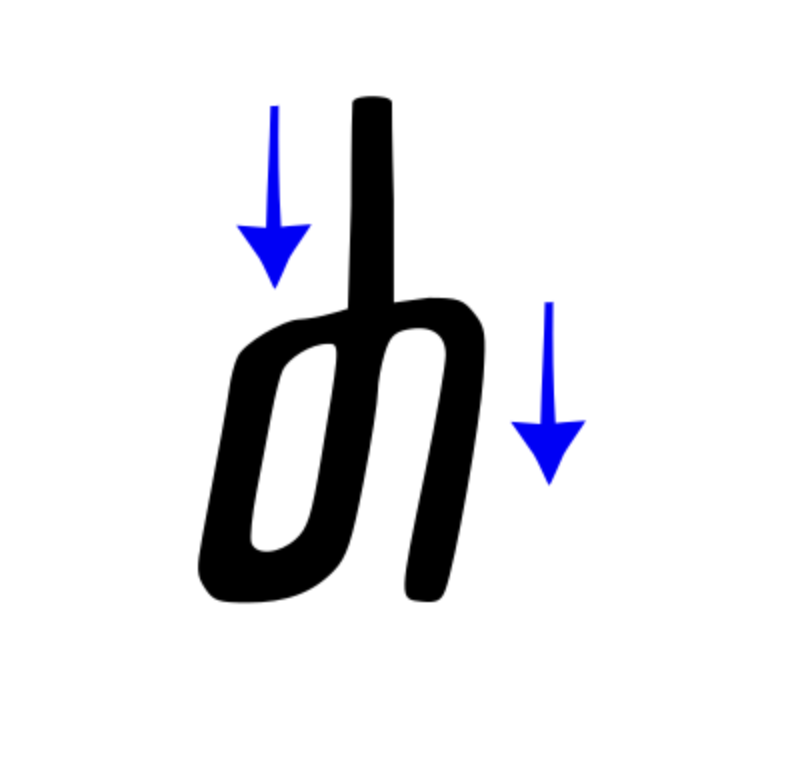
nuskhuri

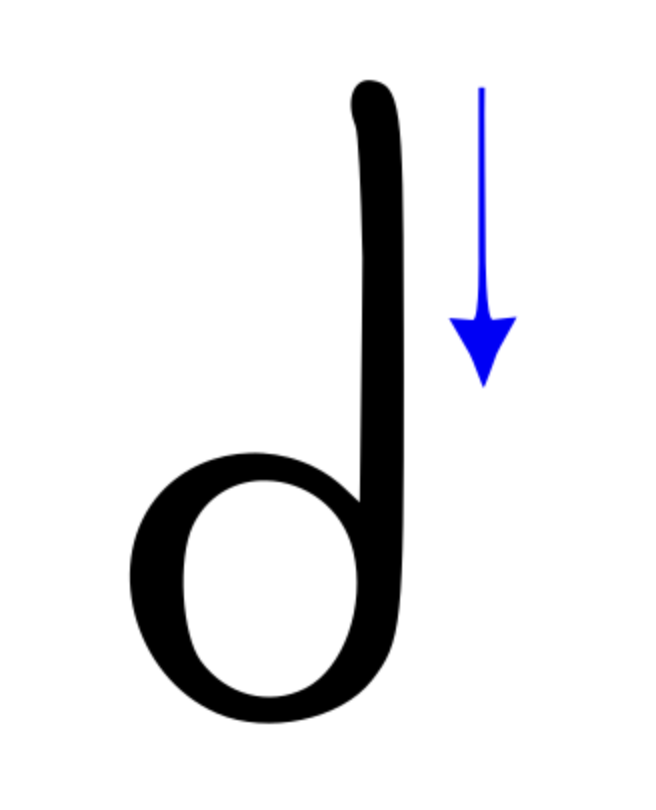
mkhedruli

== Computer encodings ==
Character information
Preview	Ⴛ		ⴛ		ძ		Ძ	
Unicode name	GEORGIAN CAPITAL LETTER JIL		GEORGIAN SMALL LETTER JIL		GEORGIAN LETTER JIL		GEORGIAN MTAVRULI CAPITAL LETTER JIL	
Encodings	decimal	hex	dec	hex	dec	hex	dec	hex
Unicode	4283	U+10BB	11547	U+2D1B	4331	U+10EB	7339	U+1CAB
UTF-8	225 130 187	E1 82 BB	226 180 155	E2 B4 9B	225 131 171	E1 83 AB	225 178 171	E1 B2 AB
Numeric character reference	&#4283;	&#x10BB;	&#11547;	&#x2D1B;	&#4331;	&#x10EB;	&#7339;	&#x1CAB;

== Braille ==
mkhedruli

== See also ==
- Latin digraph Dz
- Latin letter J
- Latin letter Ż
- Latin letter Ʒ

== Bibliography ==
- Mchedlidze, T. (1) The restored Georgian alphabet, Fulda, Germany, 2013
- Mchedlidze, T. (2) The Georgian script; Dictionary and guide, Fulda, Germany, 2013
- Machavariani, E. Georgian manuscripts, Tbilisi, 2011
- The Unicode Standard, Version 6.3, (1) Georgian, 1991–2013
- The Unicode Standard, Version 6.3, (2) Georgian Supplement, 1991–2013
