= Q'ari =

27th letter of the three Georgian scripts

- Ⴗ ⴗ ყ Ყ

Usage
- Writing system: Georgian script
- Type: Alphabetic
- Language of origin: Georgian language
- Sound values: [χʼ], [qʼ], [q͡χʼ]
- In Unicode: U+10B7, U+2D17, U+10E7, U+1CA7
- Alphabetical position: 27

History
- Time period: c. 430 to present
- Transliterations: Q, Q’, Q̇

Other
- Associated numbers: 800
- Writing direction: Left-to-right

Q'ari, or Qar (Asomtavruli: Ⴗ; Nuskhuri: ⴗ; Mkhedruli: ყ; Mtavruli: Ყ; Georgian: ყარი, ყარ) is the 27th letter of the three Georgian scripts.

In the system of Georgian numerals, it has a value of 800. Q'ari represents the uvular ejective fricative /χʼ/ (commonly phonemicized as the uvular ejective stop /qʼ/). It is typically romanized with the letter Q, Q’, or Q̇.

== Letter ==
asomtavruli	nuskhuri	mkhedruli	mtavruli

=== Three-dimensional ===
asomtavruli

nuskhuri

mkhedruli

=== Stroke order ===
asomtavruli

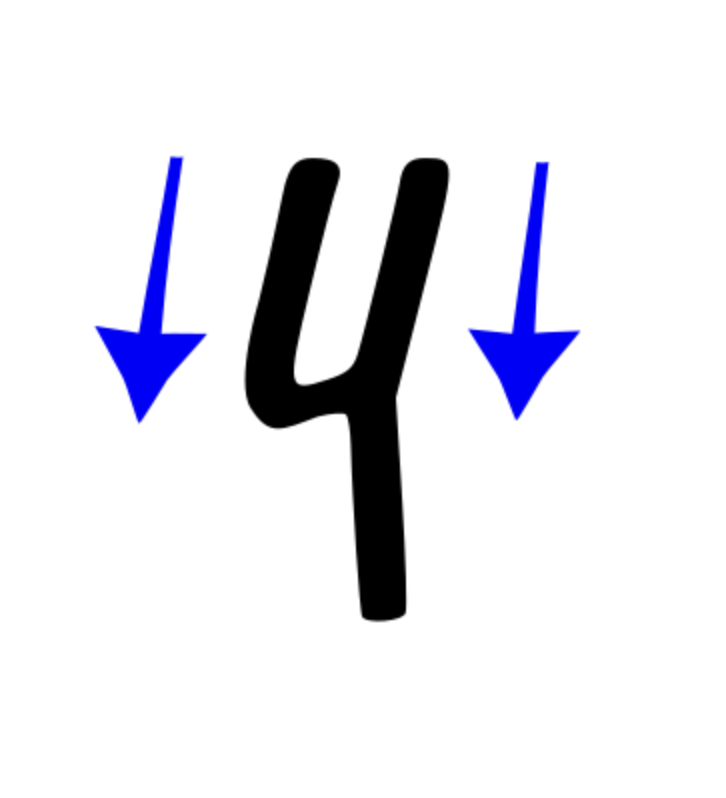
nuskhuri

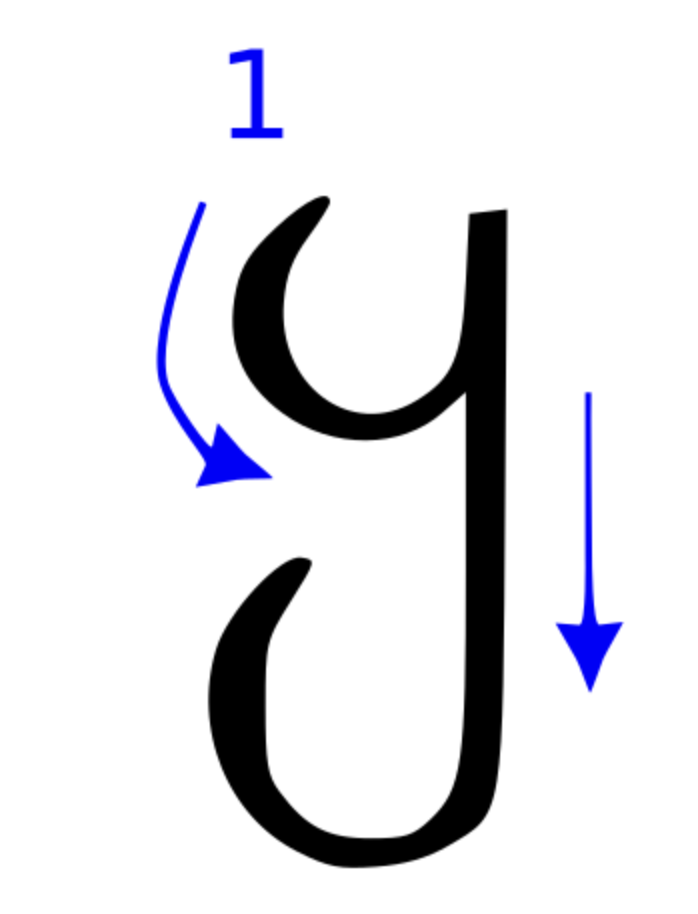
mkhedruli

== Computer encodings ==
Character information
Preview	Ⴗ		ⴗ		ყ		Ყ	
Unicode name	GEORGIAN CAPITAL LETTER QAR		GEORGIAN SMALL LETTER QAR		GEORGIAN LETTER QAR		GEORGIAN MTAVRULI CAPITAL LETTER QAR	
Encodings	decimal	hex	dec	hex	dec	hex	dec	hex
Unicode	4279	U+10B7	11543	U+2D17	4327	U+10E7	7335	U+1CA7
UTF-8	225 130 183	E1 82 B7	226 180 151	E2 B4 97	225 131 167	E1 83 A7	225 178 167	E1 B2 A7
Numeric character reference	&#4279;	&#x10B7;	&#11543;	&#x2D17;	&#4327;	&#x10E7;	&#7335;	&#x1CA7;

== Braille ==
mkhedruli

== See also ==
- Georgian letter K'ani
- Georgian letter Khari
- Latin letter Q

== Bibliography ==
- Mchedlidze, T. (1) The restored Georgian alphabet, Fulda, Germany, 2013
- Mchedlidze, T. (2) The Georgian script; Dictionary and guide, Fulda, Germany, 2013
- Machavariani, E. Georgian manuscripts, Tbilisi, 2011
- The Unicode Standard, Version 6.3, (1) Georgian, 1991–2013
- The Unicode Standard, Version 6.3, (2) Georgian Supplement, 1991-2013
