= Doni (letter) =

4th letter of the three Georgian scripts

- Ⴃ ⴃ დ Დ

Usage
- Writing system: Georgian script
- Type: Alphabetic
- Language of origin: Georgian language
- Sound values: [d̪]
- In Unicode: U+10A3, U+2D03, U+10D3, U+1C93
- Alphabetical position: 4

History
- Development: 𓉿: 𐤃; Δ δ; Ⴃ ⴃ დ Დ
- Time period: c. 430 to present
- Transliterations: D

Other
- Associated numbers: 4
- Writing direction: Left-to-right

Doni, or Don (Asomtavruli: Ⴃ; Nuskhuri: ⴃ; Mkhedruli: დ or; Mtavruli: Დ; Georgian: დონი, დონ) is the 4th letter of the three Georgian scripts.

In the system of Georgian numerals, it has a value of 4. Doni commonly represents the voiced dental plosive /d̪/, roughly like the pronunciation of ⟨d⟩ in "dome". It is typically romanized with the letter D.

== Letter ==
asomtavruli	nuskhuri	mkhedruli		mtavruli
asomtavruli	nuskhuri	standard	alternative	mtavruli

=== Three-dimensional ===
asomtavruli

nuskhuri

mkhedruli

=== Stroke order ===
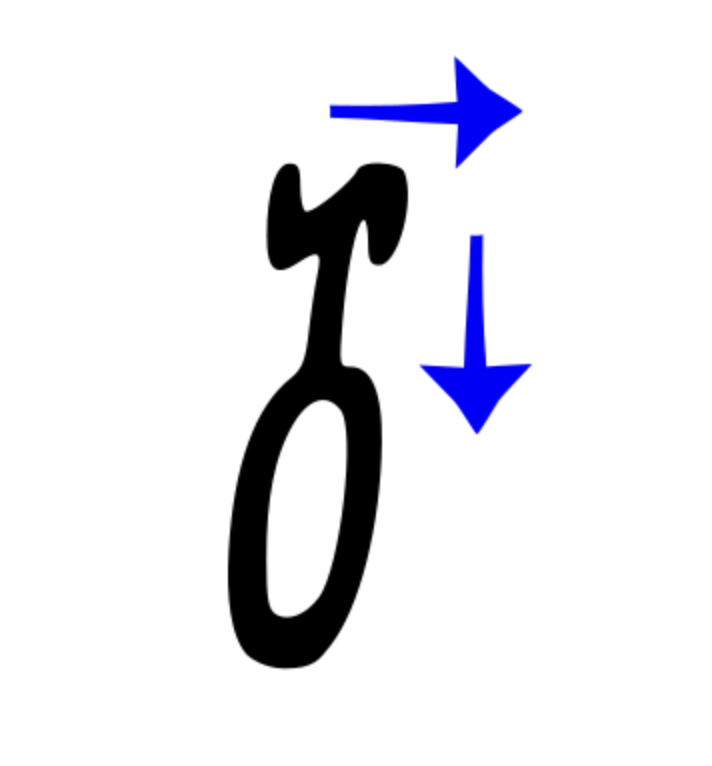
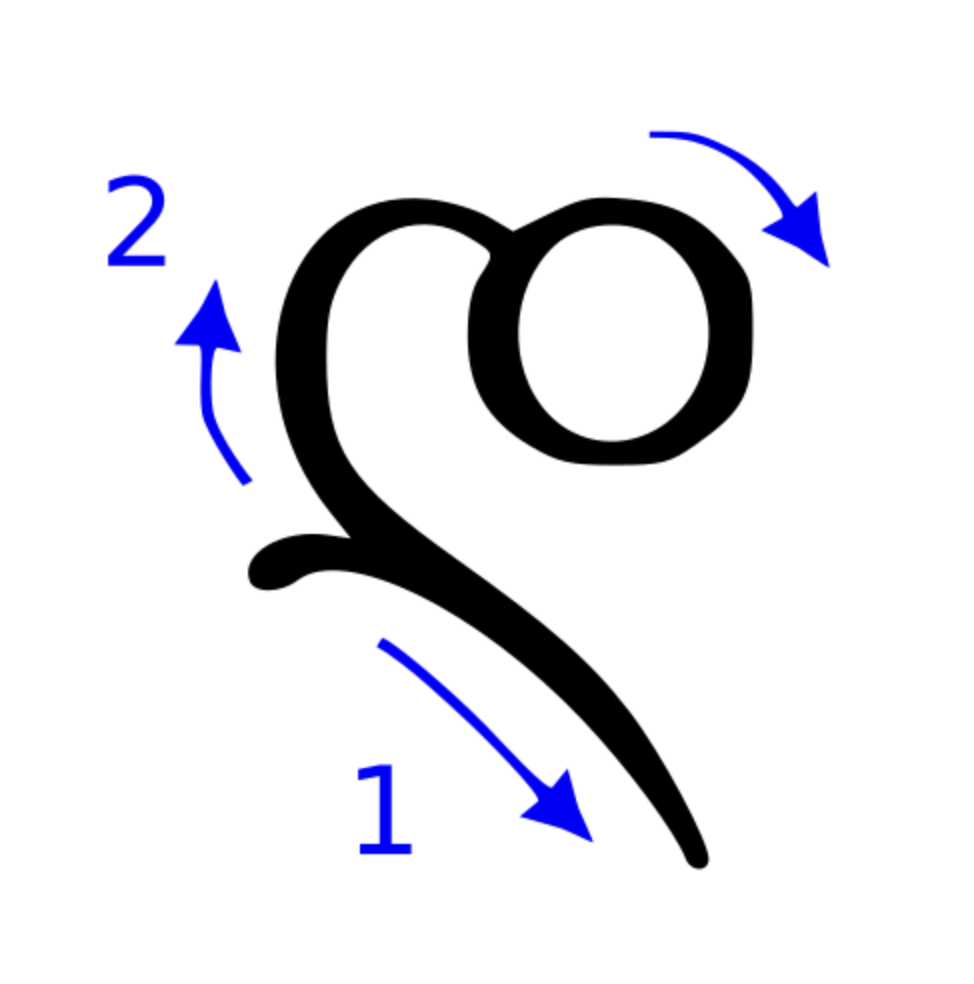
asomtavruli	nuskhuri	mkhedruli
asomtavruli	nuskhuri	standard	alternative

== Computer encodings ==
Character information
Preview	Ⴃ		ⴃ		დ		Დ	
Unicode name	GEORGIAN CAPITAL LETTER DON		GEORGIAN SMALL LETTER DON		GEORGIAN LETTER DON		GEORGIAN MTAVRULI CAPITAL LETTER DON	
Encodings	decimal	hex	dec	hex	dec	hex	dec	hex
Unicode	4259	U+10A3	11523	U+2D03	4307	U+10D3	7315	U+1C93
UTF-8	225 130 163	E1 82 A3	226 180 131	E2 B4 83	225 131 147	E1 83 93	225 178 147	E1 B2 93
Numeric character reference	&#4259;	&#x10A3;	&#11523;	&#x2D03;	&#4307;	&#x10D3;	&#7315;	&#x1C93;

== Braille ==
mkhedruli

== See also ==
- Latin letter D
- Cyrillic letter De

== Bibliography ==
- Mchedlidze, T. (1) The restored Georgian alphabet, Fulda, Germany, 2013
- Mchedlidze, T. (2) The Georgian script; Dictionary and guide, Fulda, Germany, 2013
- Machavariani, E. Georgian manuscripts, Tbilisi, 2011
- The Unicode Standard, Version 6.3, (1) Georgian, 1991–2013
- The Unicode Standard, Version 6.3, (2) Georgian Supplement, 1991-2013
