= Jani (letter) =

36th letter of the three Georgian scripts

- Ⴟ ⴟ ჯ Ჯ

Usage
- Writing system: Georgian script
- Type: Alphabetic
- Language of origin: Georgian language
- Sound values: [dʒ]

History
- Time period: c. 430 to present

Other
- Writing direction: Left-to-right

Jani or Jan (Asomtavruli: Ⴟ, Nuskhuri: ⴟ, Mkhedruli: ჯ, Mtavruli: Ჯ) is the 36th letter of the three Georgian scripts.

In the system of Georgian numerals it has a value of 8000. Jani commonly represents the voiced palato-alveolar affricate /dʒ/, like the pronunciation of ⟨dg⟩ in "hedge". It is typically romanized with the letter J.

== Letter ==
asomtavruli	nuskhuri	mkhedruli	mtavruli

=== Three-dimensional ===
asomtavruli

nuskhuri

mkhedruli

=== Stroke order ===
asomtavruli

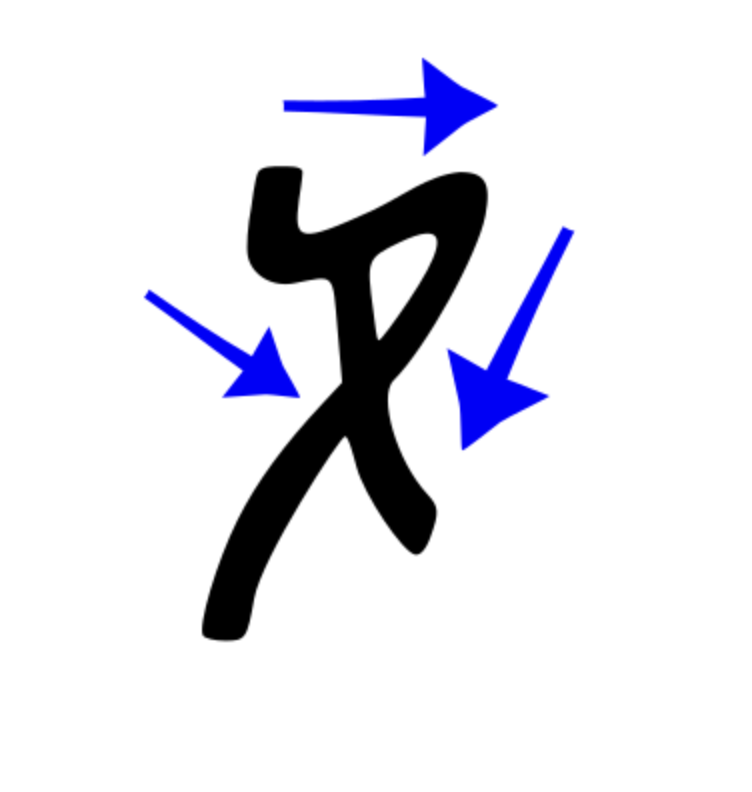
nuskhuri

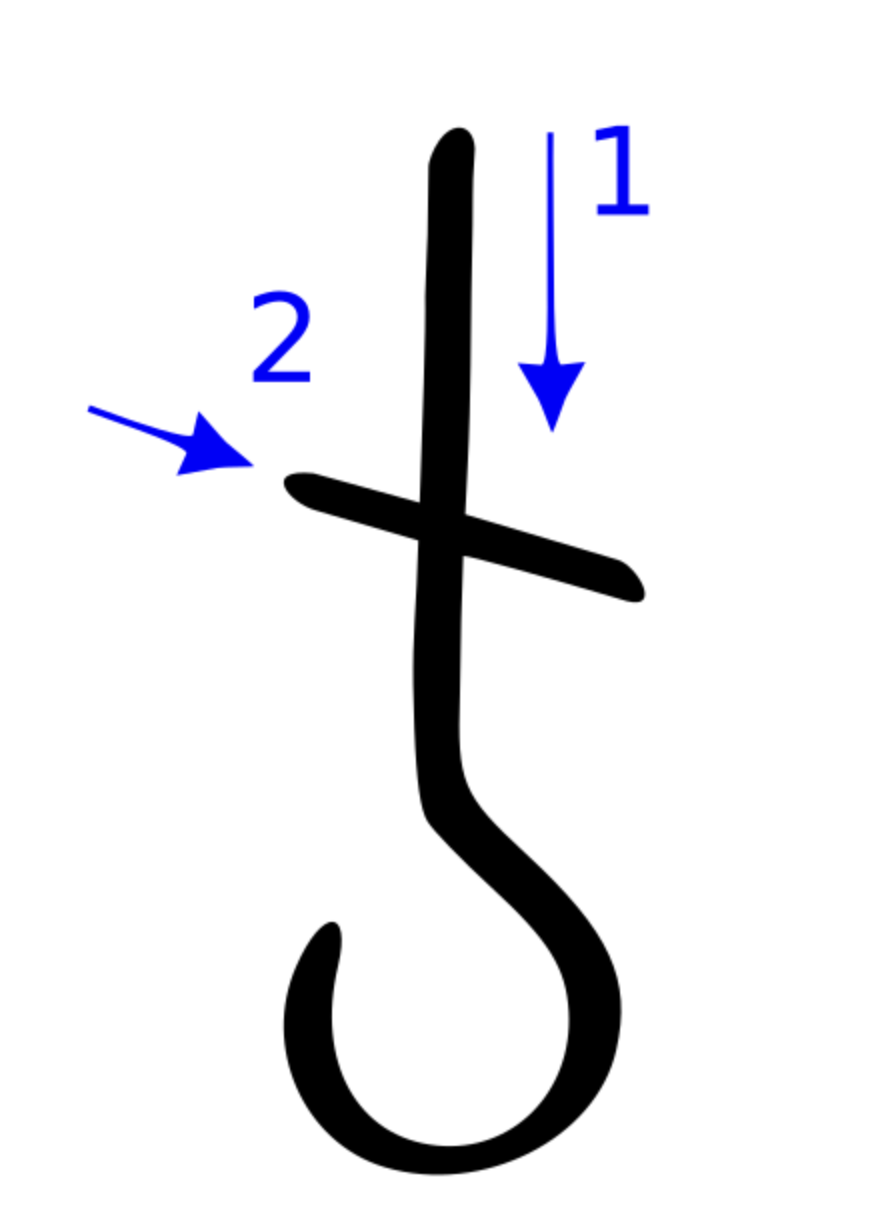
mkhedruli

== Computer encodings ==
Character information
Preview	Ⴟ		ⴟ		ჯ		Ჯ	
Unicode name	GEORGIAN CAPITAL LETTER JAN		GEORGIAN SMALL LETTER JAN		GEORGIAN LETTER JAN		GEORGIAN MTAVRULI LETTER JAN	
Encodings	decimal	hex	dec	hex	dec	hex	dec	hex
Unicode	4287	U+10BF	11551	U+2D1F	4335	U+10EF	7343	U+1CAF
UTF-8	225 130 191	E1 82 BF	226 180 159	E2 B4 9F	225 131 175	E1 83 AF	225 178 175	E1 B2 AF
Numeric character reference	&#4287;	&#x10BF;	&#11551;	&#x2D1F;	&#4335;	&#x10EF;	&#7343;	&#x1CAF;

== Braille ==
mkhedruli

== See also ==
- J, Latin letter

== Bibliography ==
- Mchedlidze, T. (1) The restored Georgian alphabet, Fulda, Germany, 2013
- Mchedlidze, T. (2) The Georgian script; Dictionary and guide, Fulda, Germany, 2013
- Machavariani, E. Georgian manuscripts, Tbilisi, 2011
- The Unicode Standard, Version 6.3, (1) Georgian, 1991–2013
- The Unicode Standard, Version 6.3, (2) Georgian Supplement, 1991–2013
