= Ts'ili =

32nd letter of the three Georgian scripts

- Ⴜ ⴜ წ Წ

Usage
- Writing system: Georgian script
- Type: Alphabetic
- Language of origin: Georgian language
- Sound values: [tsʼ]
- In Unicode: U+10BC, U+2D1C, U+10EC, U+1CAC
- Alphabetical position: 32

History
- Time period: c. 430 to present
- Transliterations: Ts, Tsʼ, C, Ç, C̣

Other
- Associated numbers: 4000
- Writing direction: Left-to-right

Ts'ili, or Ts'il (Asomtavruli: Ⴜ; Nuskhuri: ⴜ; Mkhedruli: წ; Mtavruli: Წ; Georgian: წილი, წილ) is the 32nd letter of the three Georgian scripts.

In the system of Georgian numerals, it has a value of 4000. Ts'ili represents the alveolar ejective affricate [tsʼ]. It is typically romanized with the digraphs Ts, and Tsʼ, or with the letters C, Ç, and C̣.

== Letter ==
| asomtavruli | nuskhuri | mkhedruli | mtavruli |

=== Three-dimensional ===
asomtavruli

nuskhuri

mkhedruli

=== Stroke order ===
asomtavruli

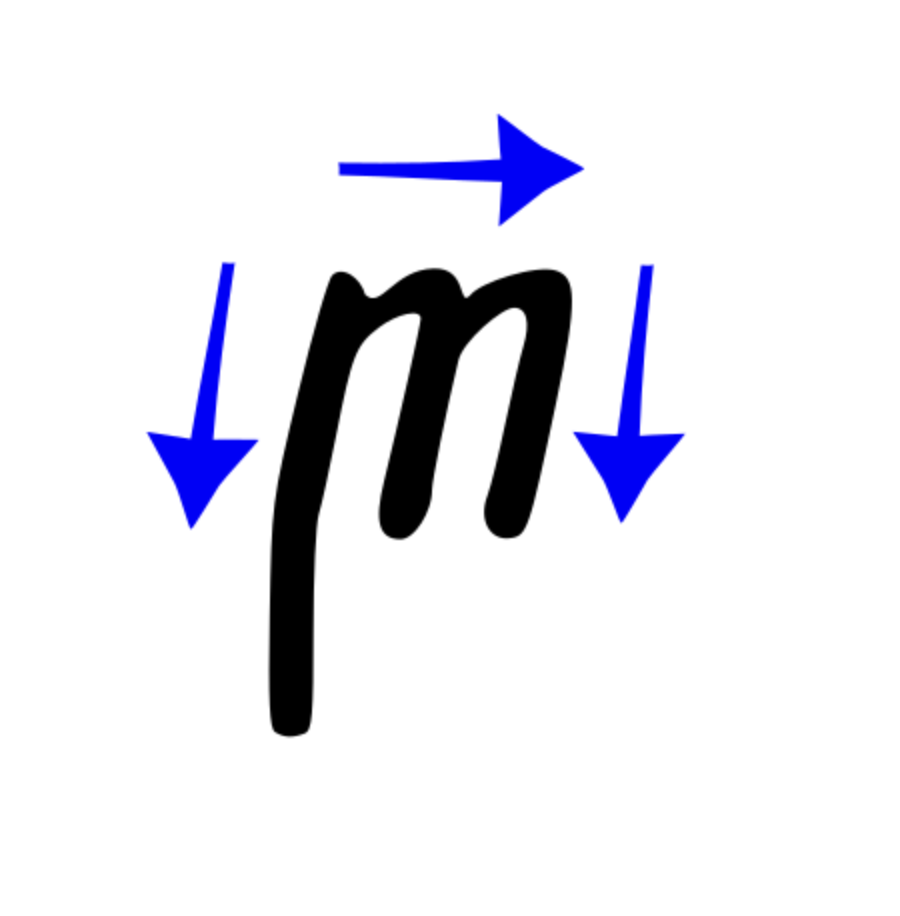
nuskhuri

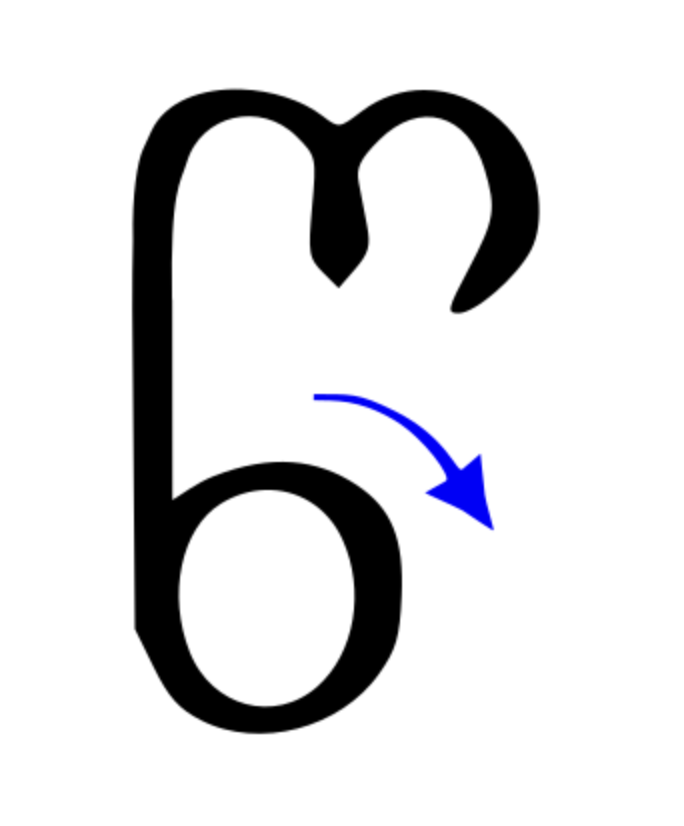
mkhedruli

== Computer encodings ==
Character information
| Preview | Ⴜ | | ⴜ | | წ | | Წ | |
|---|---|---|---|---|---|---|---|---|
| Unicode name | GEORGIAN CAPITAL LETTER CIL | | GEORGIAN SMALL LETTER CIL | | GEORGIAN LETTER CIL | | GEORGIAN MTAVRULI CAPITAL LETTER CIL | |
| Encodings | decimal | hex | dec | hex | dec | hex | dec | hex |
| Unicode | 4284 | U+10BC | 11548 | U+2D1C | 4332 | U+10EC | 7340 | U+1CAC |
| UTF-8 | 225 130 188 | E1 82 BC | 226 180 156 | E2 B4 9C | 225 131 172 | E1 83 AC | 225 178 172 | E1 B2 AC |
| Numeric character reference | &#4284; | &#x10BC; | &#11548; | &#x2D1C; | &#4332; | &#x10EC; | &#7340; | &#x1CAC; |

== Braille ==
mkhedruli

== See also ==
- Latin digraph Ts
- Latin letter C
- Latin letter Ç

== Bibliography ==
- Mchedlidze, T. (1) The restored Georgian alphabet, Fulda, Germany, 2013
- Mchedlidze, T. (2) The Georgian script; Dictionary and guide, Fulda, Germany, 2013
- Machavariani, E. Georgian manuscripts, Tbilisi, 2011
- The Unicode Standard, Version 6.3, (1) Georgian, 1991–2013
- The Unicode Standard, Version 6.3, (2) Georgian Supplement, 1991–2013
