= Rae (letter) =

19th letter of the three Georgian scripts

- Ⴐ ⴐ რ Რ

Usage
- Writing system: Georgian script
- Type: Alphabetic
- Language of origin: Georgian language
- Sound values: [r], [ɾ]
- In Unicode: U+10B0, U+2D10, U+10E0, U+1CA0
- Alphabetical position: 19

History
- Time period: c. 430 to present
- Transliterations: R

Other
- Associated numbers: 100
- Writing direction: Left-to-right

Rae (Asomtavruli: Ⴐ; Nuskhuri: ⴐ; Mkhedruli: რ or h; Mtavruli: Რ; Georgian: რაე) is the 19th letter of the three Georgian scripts.

In the system of Georgian numerals, it has a value of 100. Rae commonly represents the voiced alveolar trill /r/, like the pronunciation of ⟨r⟩ in "curd" (Scottish English) (often realized as the voiced alveolar flap /ɾ/, like the pronunciation of ⟨t⟩ in "water" in General American). It is typically romanized with the letter R.

== Letter ==
asomtavruli	nuskhuri	mkhedruli		mtavruli
asomtavruli	nuskhuri	standard	alternative	mtavruli

=== Three-dimensional ===
asomtavruli

nuskhuri

mkhedruli

=== Stroke order ===
asomtavruli

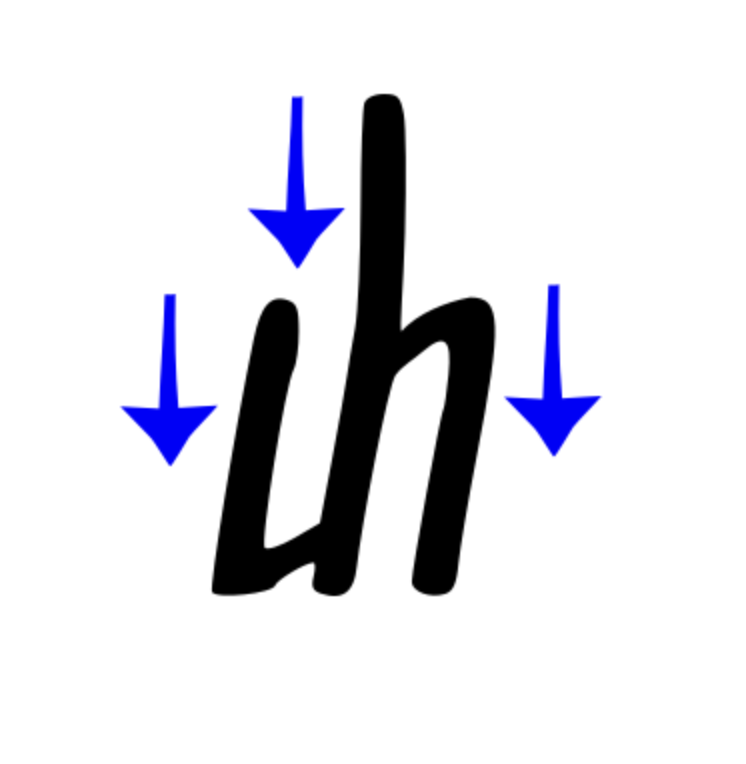
nuskhuri

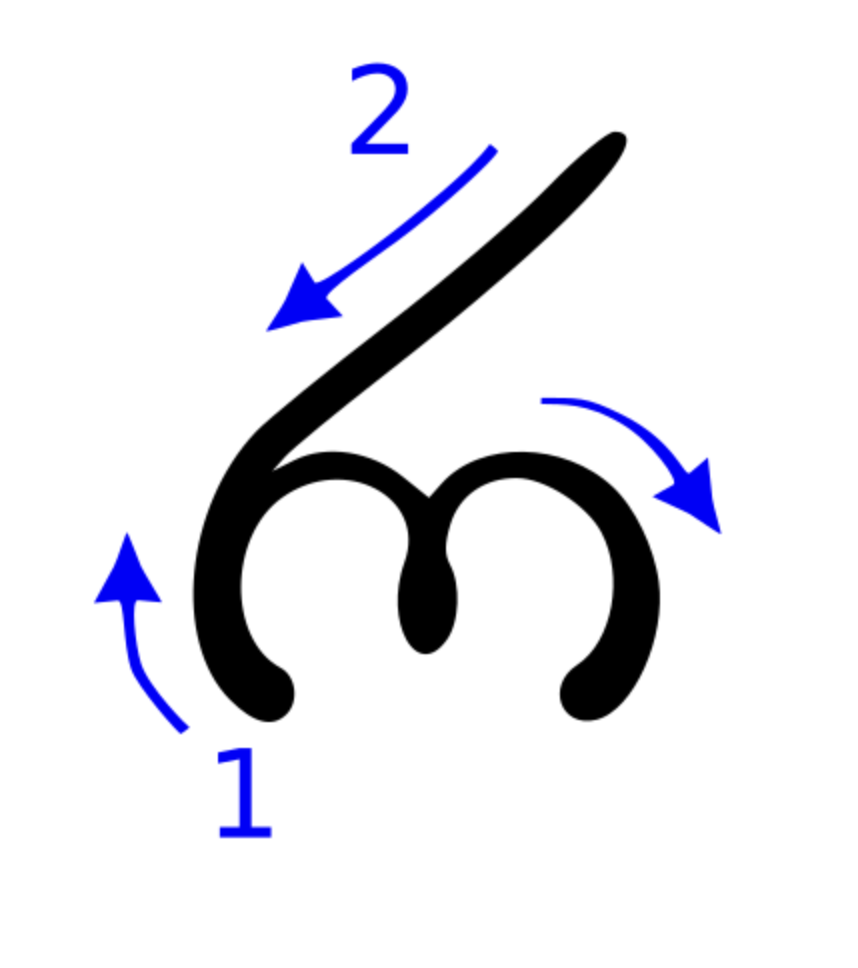
mkhedruli

== Computer encodings ==
Character information
Preview	Ⴐ		ⴐ		რ		Რ	
Unicode name	GEORGIAN CAPITAL LETTER RAE		GEORGIAN SMALL LETTER RAE		GEORGIAN LETTER RAE		GEORGIAN MTAVRULI CAPITAL LETTER RAE	
Encodings	decimal	hex	dec	hex	dec	hex	dec	hex
Unicode	4272	U+10B0	11536	U+2D10	4320	U+10E0	7328	U+1CA0
UTF-8	225 130 176	E1 82 B0	226 180 144	E2 B4 90	225 131 160	E1 83 A0	225 178 160	E1 B2 A0
Numeric character reference	&#4272;	&#x10B0;	&#11536;	&#x2D10;	&#4320;	&#x10E0;	&#7328;	&#x1CA0;

== Braille ==
mkhedruli

== See also ==
- Latin letter R
- Cyrillic letter Er

== Bibliography ==
- Mchedlidze, T. (1) The restored Georgian alphabet, Fulda, Germany, 2013
- Mchedlidze, T. (2) The Georgian script; Dictionary and guide, Fulda, Germany, 2013
- Machavariani, E. Georgian manuscripts, Tbilisi, 2011
- The Unicode Standard, Version 6.3, (1) Georgian, 1991-2013
- The Unicode Standard, Version 6.3, (2) Georgian Supplement, 1991-2013
