= Nari (letter) =

14th letter of the three Georgian scripts

- Ⴌ ⴌ ნ Ნ

Usage
- Writing system: Georgian script
- Type: Alphabetic
- Language of origin: Georgian language
- Sound values: [n]
- In Unicode: U+10AC, U+2D0C, U+10DC, U+1C9C
- Alphabetical position: 14

History
- Time period: c. 430 to present
- Transliterations: N

Other
- Associated numbers: 50
- Writing direction: Left-to-right

Nari, or Nar (Asomtavruli: Ⴌ; Nuskhuri: ⴌ; Mkhedruli: ნ; Mtavruli: Ნ; Georgian: ნარი, ნარ) is the 14th letter of the three Georgian scripts.

In the system of Georgian numerals, it has a value of 50. Nari commonly represents the voiced alveolar nasal /n/, like the pronunciation of ⟨n⟩ in "nose". It is typically romanized with the letter N.

== Letter ==
asomtavruli	nuskhuri	mkhedruli	mtavruli

=== Three-dimensional ===
asomtavruli

nuskhuri

mkhedruli

=== Stroke order ===
asomtavruli

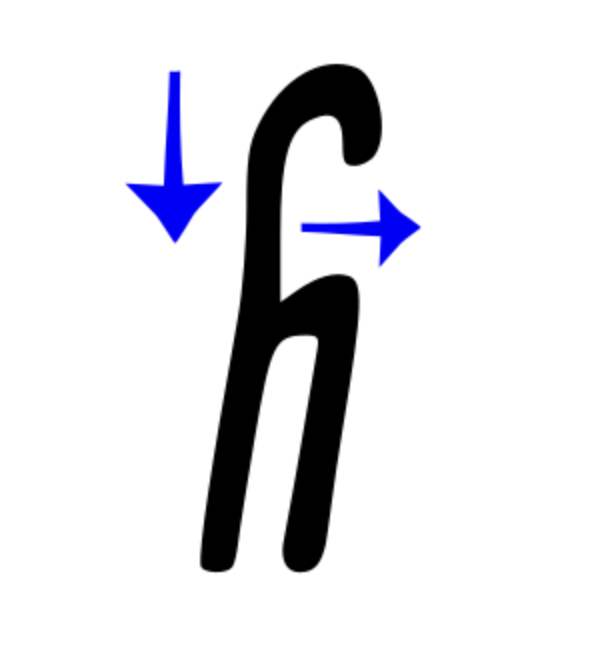
nuskhuri

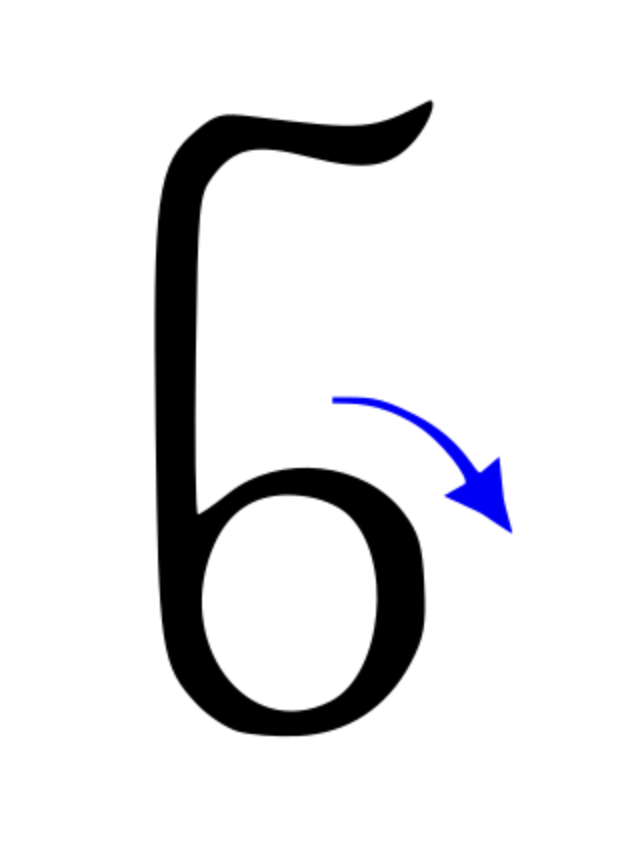
mkhedruli

== Computer encodings ==
Character information
Preview	Ⴌ		ⴌ		ნ		Ნ	
Unicode name	GEORGIAN CAPITAL LETTER NAR		GEORGIAN SMALL LETTER NAR		GEORGIAN LETTER NAR		GEORGIAN MTAVRULI CAPITAL LETTER NAR	
Encodings	decimal	hex	dec	hex	dec	hex	dec	hex
Unicode	4268	U+10AC	11532	U+2D0C	4316	U+10DC	7324	U+1C9C
UTF-8	225 130 172	E1 82 AC	226 180 140	E2 B4 8C	225 131 156	E1 83 9C	225 178 156	E1 B2 9C
Numeric character reference	&#4268;	&#x10AC;	&#11532;	&#x2D0C;	&#4316;	&#x10DC;	&#7324;	&#x1C9C;

== Braille ==
mkhedruli

== See also ==
- Latin letter N
- Cyrillic letter En

== Bibliography ==
- Mchedlidze, T. (1) The restored Georgian alphabet, Fulda, Germany, 2013
- Mchedlidze, T. (2) The Georgian script; Dictionary and guide, Fulda, Germany, 2013
- Machavariani, E. Georgian manuscripts, Tbilisi, 2011
- The Unicode Standard, Version 6.3, (1) Georgian, 1991-2013
- The Unicode Standard, Version 6.3, (2) Georgian Supplement, 1991-2013
