= Khani (letter) =

34th letter of the three Georgian scripts

- Ⴞ ⴞ ხ Ხ

Usage
- Writing system: Georgian script
- Type: Alphabetic
- Language of origin: Georgian language
- Sound values: [χ]
- In Unicode: U+10BE, U+2D1E, U+10EE, U+1CAE
- Alphabetical position: 34

History
- Time period: c. 430 to present
- Transliterations: Kh, X, Ꭓ

Other
- Associated numbers: 6000
- Writing direction: Left-to-right

Khani, or Xan (Asomtavruli: Ⴞ; Nuskhuri: ⴞ; Mkhedruli: ხ; Mtavruli: Ხ; Georgian: ხანი, ხან) is the 34th letter of the three Georgian scripts.

In the system of Georgian numerals, it has a value of 6000. Khani commonly represents the voiceless uvular fricative /χ/, roughly like the pronunciation of ⟨ch⟩ in "loch" in Scottish English. It is typically romanized with the digraph Kh, or with the letters X, and Ꭓ.

== Letter ==
asomtavruli	nuskhuri	mkhedruli	mtavruli

=== Three-dimensional ===
asomtavruli

nuskhuri

mkhedruli

=== Stroke order ===
asomtavruli

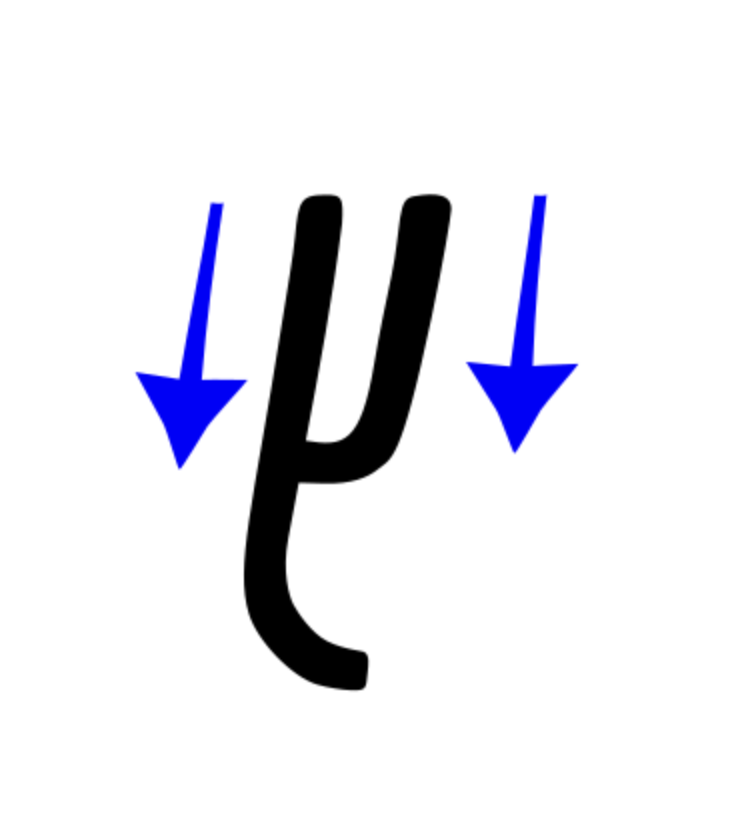
nuskhuri

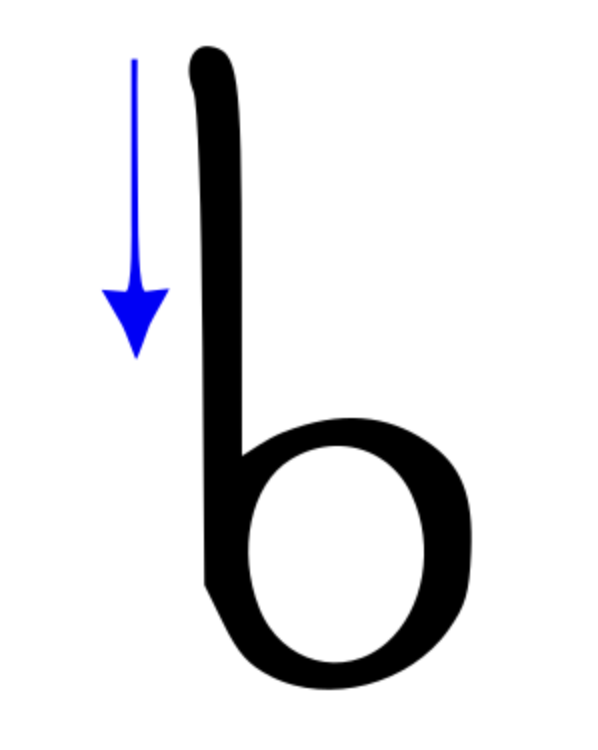
mkhedruli

== Computer encodings ==
Character information
Preview	Ⴞ		ⴞ		ხ		Ხ	
Unicode name	GEORGIAN CAPITAL LETTER XAN		GEORGIAN SMALL LETTER XAN		GEORGIAN LETTER XAN		GEORGIAN MTAVRULI CAPITAL LETTER XAN	
Encodings	decimal	hex	dec	hex	dec	hex	dec	hex
Unicode	4286	U+10BE	11550	U+2D1E	4334	U+10EE	7342	U+1CAE
UTF-8	225 130 190	E1 82 BE	226 180 158	E2 B4 9E	225 131 174	E1 83 AE	225 178 174	E1 B2 AE
Numeric character reference	&#4286;	&#x10BE;	&#11550;	&#x2D1E;	&#4334;	&#x10EE;	&#7342;	&#x1CAE;

== Braille ==
mkhedruli

== See also ==
- Latin letter X
- Latin digraph Kh
- Cyrillic letter Kha

== Bibliography ==
- Mchedlidze, T. (1) The restored Georgian alphabet, Fulda, Germany, 2013
- Mchedlidze, T. (2) The Georgian script; Dictionary and guide, Fulda, Germany, 2013
- Machavariani, E. Georgian manuscripts, Tbilisi, 2011
- The Unicode Standard, Version 6.3, (1) Georgian, 1991–2013
- The Unicode Standard, Version 6.3, (2) Georgian Supplement, 1991–2013
