= T'ari =

21st letter of the three Georgian scripts

- Ⴒ ⴒ ტ Ტ

Usage
- Writing system: Georgian script
- Type: Alphabetic
- Language of origin: Georgian language
- Sound values: [t̪’]
- In Unicode: U+10B2, U+2D12, U+10E2, U+1CA2
- Alphabetical position: 21

History
- Time period: c. 430 to present
- Transliterations: T, T’, Ṭ, Ţ

Other
- Associated numbers: 300
- Writing direction: Left-to-right

T'ari, or Tar (Asomtavruli: Ⴒ; Nuskhuri: ⴒ; Mkhedruli: ტ; Mtavruli: Ტ; Georgian: ტარი, ტარ) is the 21st letter of the three Georgian scripts.

In the system of Georgian numerals, it has a value of 300. It represents the dental ejective stop /t̪’/. It is typically romanized with the letter T, T’, Ṭ, or Ţ.

== Letter ==
asomtavruli	nuskhuri	mkhedruli	mtavruli

=== Three-dimensional ===
asomtavruli

nuskhuri

mkhedruli

=== Stroke order ===
asomtavruli

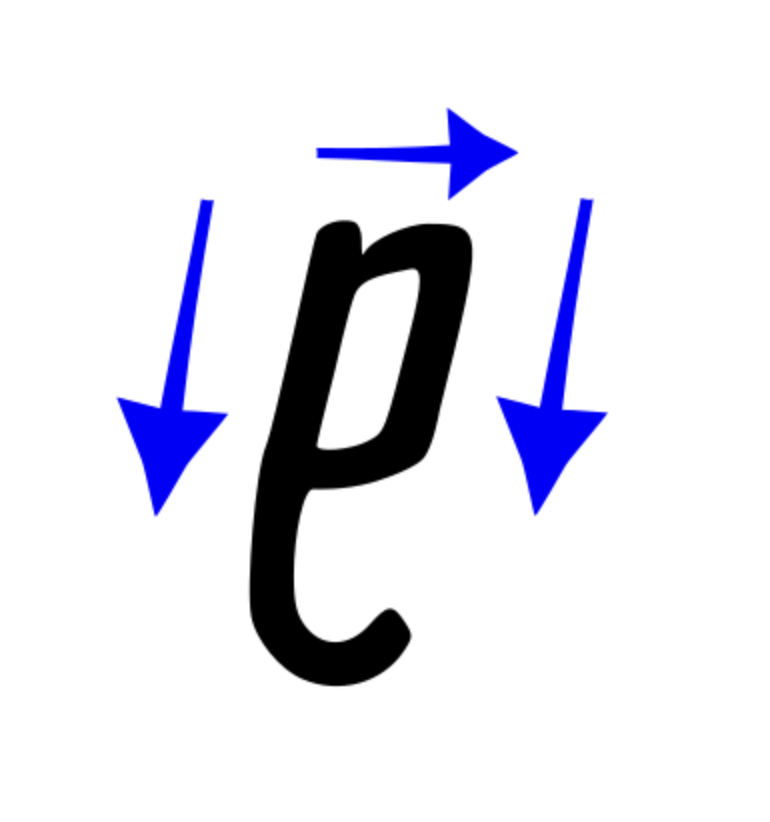
nuskhuri

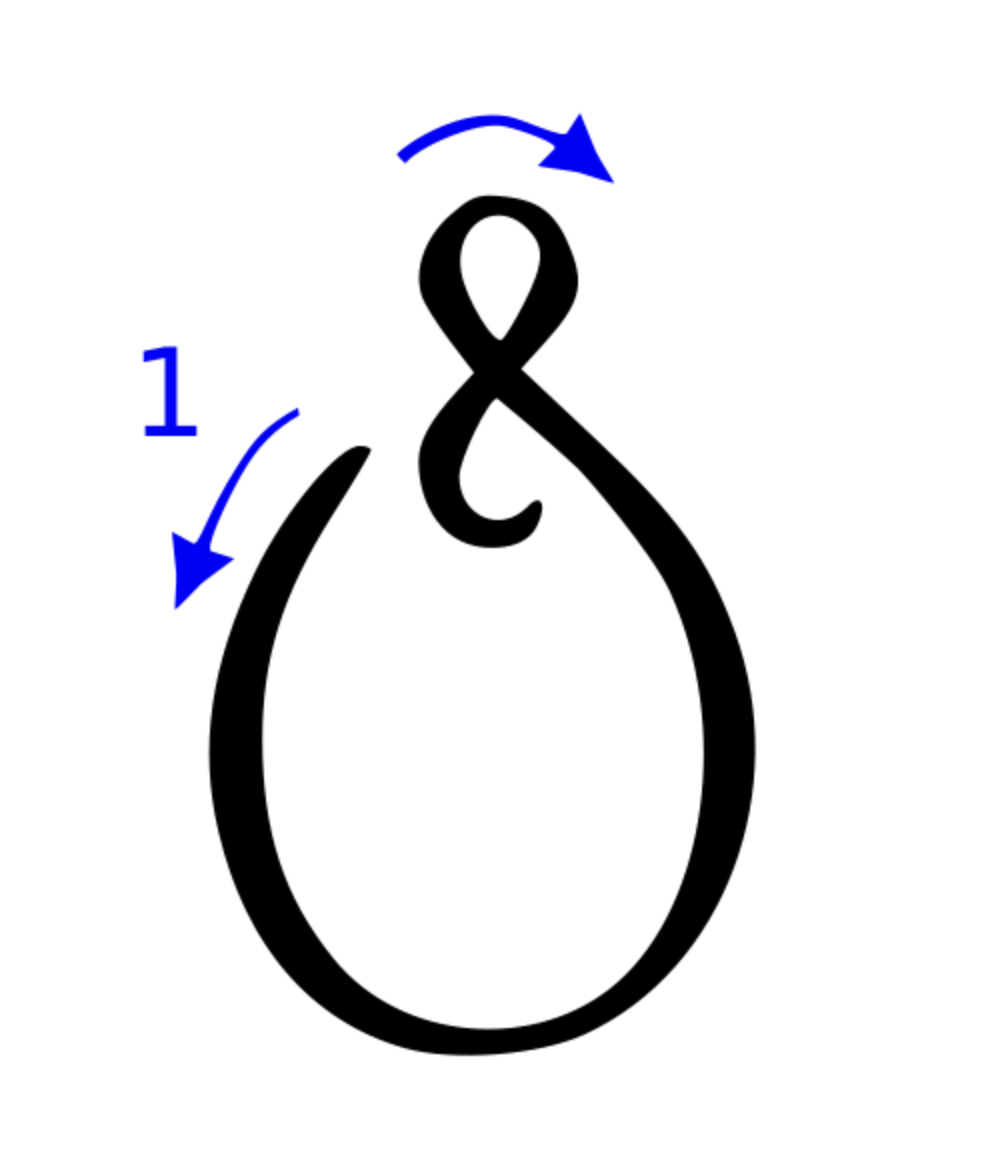
mkhedruli

== Computer encodings ==
Character information
Preview	Ⴒ		ⴒ		ტ		Ტ	
Unicode name	GEORGIAN CAPITAL LETTER TAR		GEORGIAN SMALL LETTER TAR		GEORGIAN LETTER TAR		GEORGIAN MTAVRULI CAPITAL LETTER TAR	
Encodings	decimal	hex	dec	hex	dec	hex	dec	hex
Unicode	4274	U+10B2	11538	U+2D12	4322	U+10E2	7330	U+1CA2
UTF-8	225 130 178	E1 82 B2	226 180 146	E2 B4 92	225 131 162	E1 83 A2	225 178 162	E1 B2 A2
Numeric character reference	&#4274;	&#x10B2;	&#11538;	&#x2D12;	&#4322;	&#x10E2;	&#7330;	&#x1CA2;

== Braille ==
mkhedruli

== See also ==
- T (Latin)
- Tani (letter)
- Te (Cyrillic)

== Bibliography ==
- Mchedlidze, T. (1) The restored Georgian alphabet, Fulda, Germany, 2013
- Mchedlidze, T. (2) The Georgian script; Dictionary and guide, Fulda, Germany, 2013
- Machavariani, E. Georgian manuscripts, Tbilisi, 2011
- The Unicode Standard, Version 6.3, (1) Georgian, 1991-2013
- The Unicode Standard, Version 6.3, (2) Georgian Supplement, 1991-2013
