= Bashplemi lake tablet =

1st millennium BCE tablet from Georgia

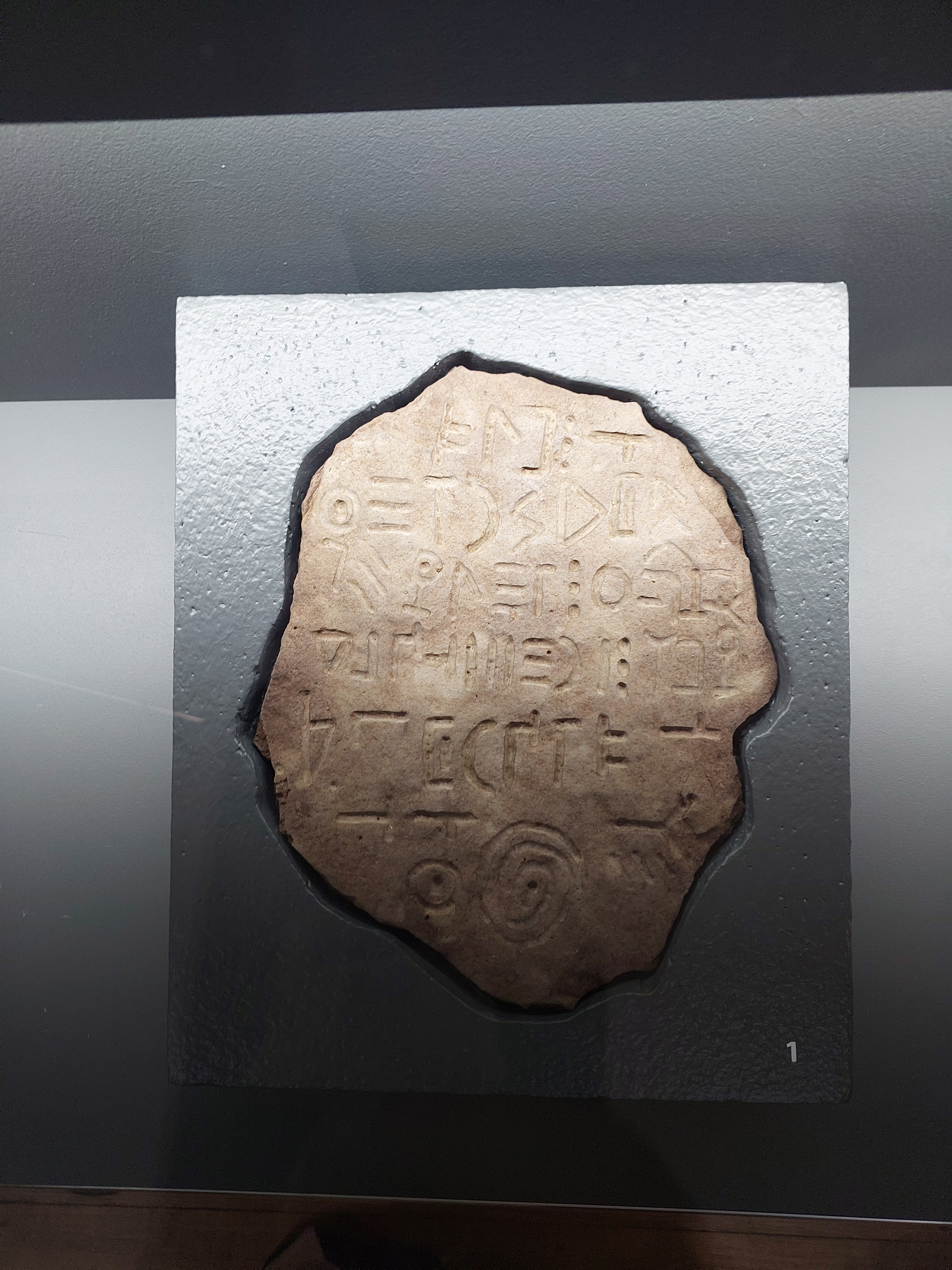

The Bashplemi Lake Tablet (Georgian: ბაშფლემის ტბის ფილა, romanized: bashplemis t'bis pila) was found near Lake Bashplemi in the Dmanisi region of Georgia. Made of basalt and thought to date to around the first millennium BCE, it is inscribed with a previously unknown writing system, at least 60 characters in length.

== Discovery ==
The tablet was found in 2021 by a group of local fishermen.

The tablet's archaeological context suggests it dates back to the Late Bronze Age or Early Iron Age.

== Description ==
The tablet measures 24.1 by 20.1 cm and seems to be made from locally sourced vesicular basalt.

The carving was made with a conical drill and then smoothed.

== Symbols ==
There are 39 unique characters in seven horizontal lines. They show some similarities with other early scripts, particularly the proto-Kartvelian script, but also the Colchian runes, the Grakliani Hill script and Asomtavruli.
