= Ini (Georgian letter) =

10th letter of the three Georgian scripts

- Ⴈ ⴈ ი Ი

Usage
- Writing system: Georgian script
- Type: Alphabetic
- Language of origin: Georgian language
- Sound values: [i], [ɪ]
- In Unicode: U+10A8, U+2D08, U+10D8, U+1C98
- Alphabetical position: 10

History
- Time period: c. 430 to present
- Transliterations: I

Other
- Associated numbers: 10
- Writing direction: Left-to-right

Ini, or In (Asomtavruli: Ⴈ; Nuskhuri: ⴈ; Mkhedruli: ი; Mtavruli: Ი: Georgian: ინი, ინ) is the 10th letter of the three Georgian scripts.

In the system of Georgian numerals, it has a value of 10. Ini commonly represents the close front unrounded vowel /i/, like the pronunciation of ⟨i⟩ in "machine", or the near-close near-front unrounded vowel /ɪ/, like the pronunciation of ⟨i⟩ in "sin". It is typically romanized with the letter I.

An additional mkhedruli ini letter, ი̄ with a macron is used in Svan language.

== Letter ==
| asomtavruli | nuskhuri | mkhedruli | mtavruli |

=== Three-dimensional ===
asomtavruli

nuskhuri

mkhedruli

=== Stroke order ===
asomtavruli

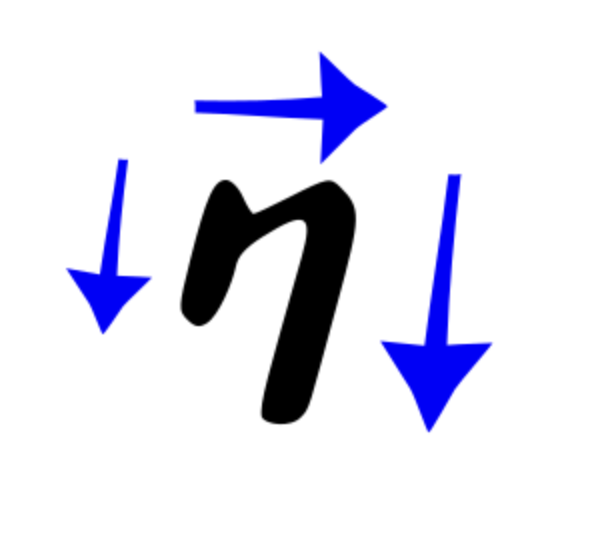
nuskhuri

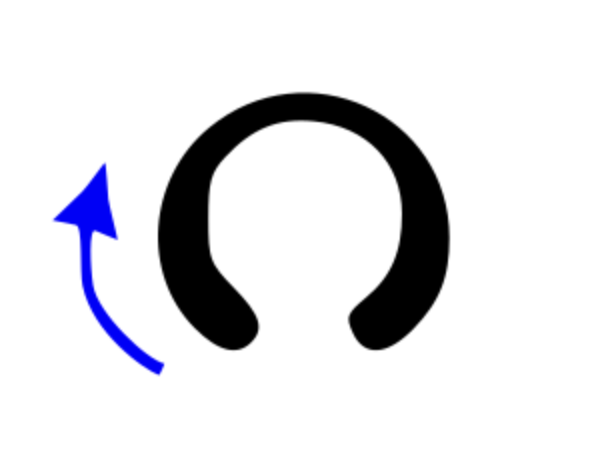
mkhedruli

== Computer encodings ==
Character information
| Preview | Ⴈ | | ⴈ | | ი | | Ი | |
|---|---|---|---|---|---|---|---|---|
| Unicode name | GEORGIAN CAPITAL LETTER IN | | GEORGIAN SMALL LETTER IN | | GEORGIAN LETTER IN | | GEORGIAN MTAVRULI CAPITAL LETTER IN | |
| Encodings | decimal | hex | dec | hex | dec | hex | dec | hex |
| Unicode | 4264 | U+10A8 | 11528 | U+2D08 | 4312 | U+10D8 | 7320 | U+1C98 |
| UTF-8 | 225 130 168 | E1 82 A8 | 226 180 136 | E2 B4 88 | 225 131 152 | E1 83 98 | 225 178 152 | E1 B2 98 |
| Numeric character reference | &#4264; | &#x10A8; | &#11528; | &#x2D08; | &#4312; | &#x10D8; | &#7320; | &#x1C98; |

== With diacritic ==
ი̄
U+10D8
U+0304

== Braille ==
mkhedruli

== See also ==
- Latin letter I
- Cyrillic letter I
- Greek letter Iota
- Armenian letter Ini

== Bibliography ==
- Mchedlidze, T. (1) The restored Georgian alphabet, Fulda, Germany, 2013
- Mchedlidze, T. (2) The Georgian script; Dictionary and guide, Fulda, Germany, 2013
- Machavariani, E. Georgian manuscripts, Tbilisi, 2011
- The Unicode Standard, Version 6.3, (1) Georgian, 1991–2013
- The Unicode Standard, Version 6.3, (2) Georgian Supplement, 1991–2013
