= Mac OS Georgian =

Character encoding for Mac OS

Mac OS Georgian is a character encoding for Mac OS created by Michael Everson for use in his fonts. It is not an official Mac OS character set.

The encoding is a form of extended ASCII, with the Georgian characters occupying the upper half of the 8-bit code space. Like the Georgian Unicode block, Mac OS Georgian encodes the characters from the Asomtavruli and Mkhedruli scripts (the former is used primarily in Georgian Orthodox Church materials, while the latter is used for most Georgian writing); it also includes a number of symbols and punctuation marks not found in 7-bit ASCII. All characters in Mac OS Georgian that also appear in Mac OS Roman are placed at the same locations as in Mac OS Roman, aiding compatibility with applications designed for Mac OS Roman.

Each character is shown with its equivalent Unicode code point. Only the second half of the table (code points 128–255) is shown, the first half (code points 0–127) being the same as ASCII.

Mac OS Georgian
	0	1	2	3	4	5	6	7	8	9	A	B	C	D	E	F
8x	Ⴀ	Ⴁ	Ⴂ	Ⴃ	Ⴄ	Ⴅ	Ⴆ	Ⴇ	Ⴈ	Ⴉ	Ⴊ	Ⴋ	Ⴌ	Ⴍ	Ⴎ	Ⴏ
9x	Ⴐ	Ⴑ	Ⴒ	Ⴓ	Ⴔ	Ⴕ	Ⴖ	Ⴗ	Ⴘ	Ⴙ	Ⴚ	Ⴛ	Ⴜ	Ⴝ	Ⴞ	Ⴟ
Ax	†	°	¢	£	§	•	¶	̣	®	©	™	́	̈	≠	Ⴡ	Ⴢ
Bx	∞	±	≤	≥	¥	µ	∂	∑	Ⴥ	ჵ	∫	ჶ	ჸ	ჷ	ჱ	ჲ
Cx	̆	̄	¬	√	ƒ	≈	∆	«	»	…	NBSP	Ⴠ	ჰ	჻	Ⴣ	ჳ
Dx	–	—	“	”	‘	’	÷	„	Ⴤ	ჴ	/	€	‹	›	№	ჯ
Ex	ა	ბ	გ	დ	ე	ვ	ზ	თ	ი	კ	ლ	მ	ნ	ო	პ	ჟ
Fx	რ	ს	ტ	უ	ფ	ქ	ღ	ყ	შ	ჩ	ც	ძ	წ	ჭ	ხ	։
