= Georgian Extended =

- Range: U+1C90..U+1CBF (48 code points)
- Plane: BMP
- Scripts: Georgian
- Assigned: 46 code points
- Unused: 2 reserved code points

Unicode version history
- 11.0 (2018): 46 (+46)

Unicode documentation
- Code chart ∣ Web page

Georgian Extended is a Unicode block containing Georgian Mtavruli (Georgian: მთავრული, "title" or "heading") letters that function as uppercase versions of their Mkhedruli counterparts in the Georgian block. Unlike all other casing scripts in Unicode, there is no title casing between Mkhedruli and Mtavruli letters, because Mtavruli is typically used only in all-caps text, although there have been some historical attempts at capitalization.

== Block ==
Georgian Extended^{[1]}^{[2]} Official Unicode Consortium code chart (PDF)
	0	1	2	3	4	5	6	7	8	9	A	B	C	D	E	F
U+1C9x	Ა	Ბ	Გ	Დ	Ე	Ვ	Ზ	Თ	Ი	Კ	Ლ	Მ	Ნ	Ო	Პ	Ჟ
U+1CAx	Რ	Ს	Ტ	Უ	Ფ	Ქ	Ღ	Ყ	Შ	Ჩ	Ც	Ძ	Წ	Ჭ	Ხ	Ჯ
U+1CBx	Ჰ	Ჱ	Ჲ	Ჳ	Ჴ	Ჵ	Ჶ	Ჷ	Ჸ	Ჹ	Ჺ			Ჽ	Ჾ	Ჿ
Notes: 1. As of Unicode version 16.0; 2. Grey areas indicate non-assigned code points

== History ==
The following Unicode-related documents record the purpose and process of defining specific characters in the Georgian Extended block:

Version	Final code points (Note: Proposed code points and characters names may differ from final code points and names)	Count	L2 ID	WG2 ID	Document
11.0	U+1C90..1CBA, 1CBD..1CBF	46	L2/16-034	N4707	Everson, Michael; Gujejiani, Nika; Razmadze, Akaki (2016-01-24), Proposal for the addition of Georgian characters
11.0	U+1C90..1CBA, 1CBD..1CBF	46	L2/16-081	N4712	Everson, Michael (2016-05-03), Revised proposal for the addition of Georgian characters
11.0	U+1C90..1CBA, 1CBD..1CBF	46	L2/16-156		Anderson, Deborah; Whistler, Ken; Pournader, Roozbeh; Glass, Andrew; Iancu, Laurențiu (2016-05-06), "2. Georgian", Recommendations to UTC #147 May 2016 on Script Proposals
11.0	U+1C90..1CBA, 1CBD..1CBF	46	L2/16-121		Moore, Lisa (2016-05-20), "C.8", UTC #147 Minutes
11.0	U+1C90..1CBA, 1CBD..1CBF	46		N4873R (pdf, doc)	"10.2.1", Unconfirmed minutes of WG 2 meeting 65, 2018-03-16
11.0	U+1C90..1CBA, 1CBD..1CBF	46	L2/16-278		Anderson, Deborah (2016-10-06), Brief IR Report on WG2 Meeting #65, OWG-SORT, and SC2 #21, San Jose, CA
11.0	U+1C90..1CBA, 1CBD..1CBF	46	L2/16-339R	N4774	Loomis, Steven (2016-11-07), Georgian Language Ad-Hoc report
11.0	U+1C90..1CBA, 1CBD..1CBF	46	L2/16-353R	N4776	Everson, Michael (2016-11-16), Georgian Minister of Education and Science support for "Mtavruli" encoding proposal
11.0	U+1C90..1CBA, 1CBD..1CBF	46	L2/17-016		Moore, Lisa (2017-02-08), "C.10.1", UTC #150 Minutes
11.0	U+1C90..1CBA, 1CBD..1CBF	46	L2/17-045		Razmadze, Akaki (2017-01-23), Response to UTC on Mtavruli
11.0	U+1C90..1CBA, 1CBD..1CBF	46	L2/17-050R		Loomis, Steven (2017-05-09), Georgian: Comments on Database Stability
11.0	U+1C90..1CBA, 1CBD..1CBF	46	L2/17-103		Moore, Lisa (2017-05-18), "C.10", UTC #151 Minutes
11.0	U+1C90..1CBA, 1CBD..1CBF	46	L2/17-199	N4827	Everson, Michael; Gujejiani, Nika; Vakhtangishvili, Giorgi; Razmadze, Akaki (2017-06-24), Action plan for the complete representation of Mtavruli characters
