= Georgian scripts =

Three related alphabets used to write Georgian

Georgian
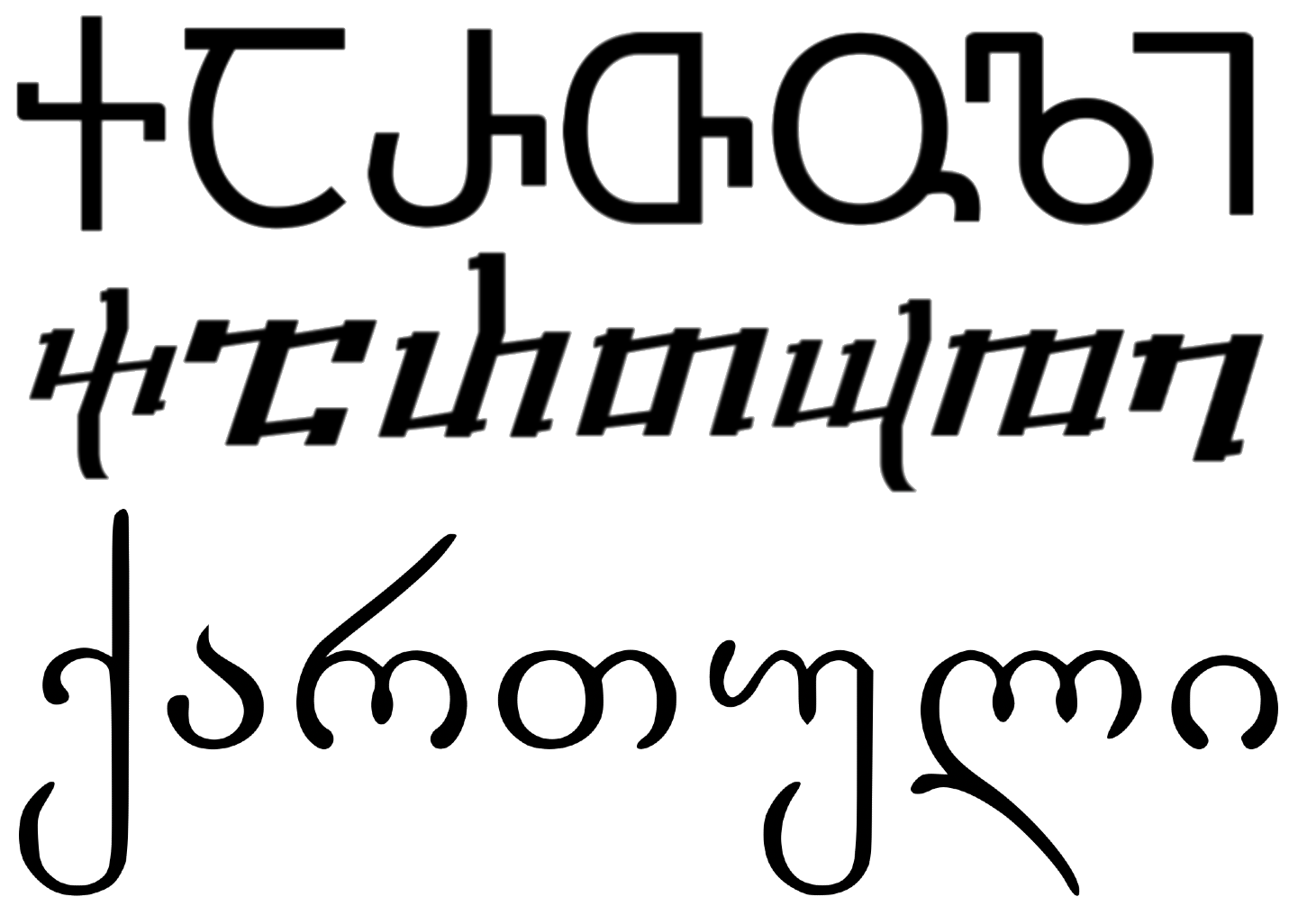
- Script type: Alphabet
- Period: AD 430 (Note: Dated per Bir el Qutt inscriptions, archaeologically documented oldest found Georgian inscription. Exact date of introduction is unclear.)–present
- Direction: Left-to-right
- Languages: Georgian, Mingrelian, Svan, Bats and Laz

Related scripts
- Parent systems: Uncertain, alphabetical order modelled on Greek: Georgian

ISO 15924
- ISO 15924: Geor (240), Georgian (Mkhedruli and Mtavruli) – Georgian (Mkhedruli); Geok, 241 – Khutsuri (Asomtavruli and Nuskhuri)

Unicode
- Unicode alias: Georgian
- Unicode range: U+10A0–U+10FF Georgian; U+2D00–U+2D2F Supplement; U+1C90–U+1CBF Extended

Living culture of three writing systems of the Georgian alphabet
- UNESCO Intangible Cultural Heritage
- Country: Georgia
- Reference: 01205
- Region: Europe and North America

Inscription history
- Inscription: 2016 (11 session)
- List: Representative

The Georgian scripts are the three writing systems used to write the Georgian language: Asomtavruli, Nuskhuri and Mkhedruli. Although the systems differ in appearance, their letters share the same names and alphabetical order and are written horizontally from left to right. Of the three scripts, Mkhedruli, once the official script of the Kingdom of Georgia and mostly used for the royal charters, is now the standard script for modern Georgian and its related Kartvelian languages, whereas Asomtavruli and Nuskhuri are used only by the Georgian Orthodox Church, in ceremonial religious texts and iconography.

Georgian scripts are unique in their appearance and their exact origin has never been established; however, in strictly structural terms, their alphabetical order largely corresponds to the Greek alphabet, with the exception of letters denoting uniquely Georgian sounds, which are grouped at the end. Originally consisting of 38 letters, Georgian is presently written in a 33-letter alphabet, as five letters are obsolete. The number of Georgian letters used in other Kartvelian languages varies. Mingrelian uses 36: thirty-three that are current Georgian letters, one obsolete Georgian letter, and two additional letters specific to Mingrelian and Svan. Laz uses the same 33 current Georgian letters as Mingrelian plus that same obsolete letter and a letter borrowed from Greek for a total of 35. The fourth Kartvelian language, Svan, is not commonly written, but when it is, it uses Georgian letters as utilized in Mingrelian, with an additional obsolete Georgian letter and sometimes supplemented by diacritics for its many vowels.

The "living culture of three writing systems of the Georgian alphabet" was granted the national status of intangible cultural heritage in Georgia in 2015 and inscribed on the UNESCO Representative List of the Intangible Cultural Heritage of Humanity in 2016.

== Preview ==
The three Georgian scripts: Asomtavruli, Nuskhuri, and Mkhedruli.

== Origins ==
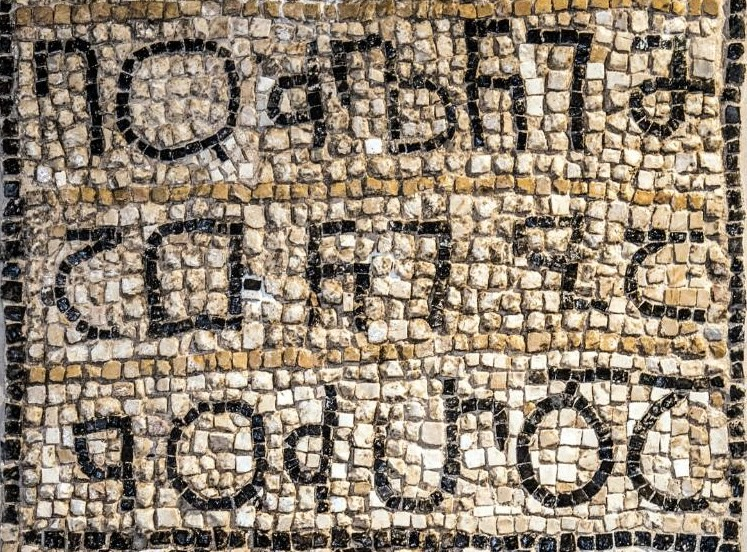
Bir el Qutt inscriptions, c. 430 AD, Terra Sancta Museum, Jerusalem

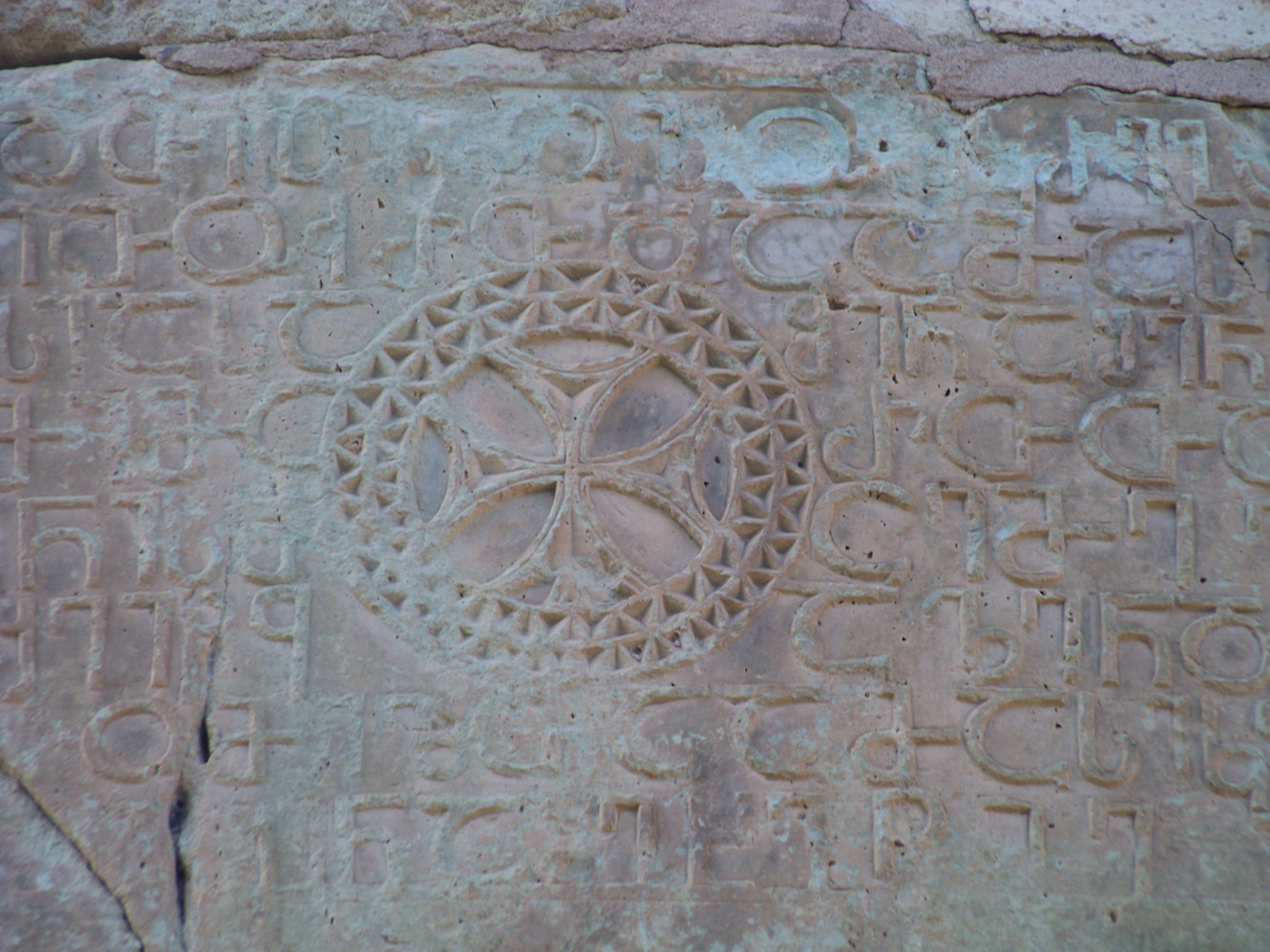
Bolnisi inscriptions, c. 494 AD, Simon Janashia Museum of Georgia, Tbilisi

The origin of the Georgian script is poorly known, and no full agreement exists among Georgian and non-Georgian scholars as to when the script was created, who designed it, and the main influences on that process.

The first attested version of the script is Asomtavruli, which dates back to the 5th century; the other scripts were formed in the following centuries. Most scholars link the creation of the Georgian script to the process of Christianization of Iberia (not to be confused with the Iberian Peninsula), a core Georgian kingdom of Kartli. The alphabet was therefore most probably created between the conversion of Iberia under King Mirian III (326 or 337) and the Bir el Qutt inscriptions of 430. It was first used for translation of the Bible and other Christian literature into Georgian, by monks in Georgia and Palestine. Professor Levan Chilashvili's dating of fragmented Asomtavruli inscriptions, discovered by him at the ruined town of Nekresi, in Georgia's easternmost province of Kakheti, in the 1980s, to the 2nd or 1st century BC has not been accepted.

A Georgian tradition first attested in the medieval chronicle Lives of the Kings of Kartli (c. 800), assigns a much earlier, pre-Christian origin to the Georgian alphabet, and names King Pharnavaz I (3rd century BC) as its inventor. This account is now considered legendary, and is rejected by scholarly consensus, as no archaeological confirmation has been found. Scholars such as Tamaz Gamkrelidze, A. Potskhishvili and Z. Sarjveladze suggested that the account of Pharnavaz's invention of Georgian writing system should be understood as the introduction of alloglottography in foreign scripts: Gamkrelidze argues that Pharnavaz introduced writing on the basis of Aramaic script: the text was synchronically translated from Georgian and written down in Aramaic by a specialist. Potskhishvili argues that Greek graphics were used instead.

Another point of contention among scholars is the role played by Armenian clerics in that process. According to medieval Armenian sources and a number of scholars, Mesrop Mashtots, generally acknowledged as the creator of the Armenian alphabet, also allegedly created the Georgian and Caucasian Albanian alphabets. This tradition originates in the works of Koryun, a fifth-century historian and biographer of Mashtots, and has been quoted by Donald Rayfield and James R. Russell, but has been rejected by Georgian scholarship and some Western scholars who judge the passage in Koryun unreliable or even a later interpolation. In his study on the history of the invention of the Armenian alphabet and the life of Mashtots, the Armenian linguist Hrachia Acharian strongly defended Koryun as a reliable source and rejected criticisms of his accounts on the invention of the Georgian script by Mashtots. Acharian dated the invention to 408, four years after Mashtots created the Armenian alphabet (he dated the latter event to 404). Some Western scholars quote Koryun's claims without taking a stance on its validity or concede that Armenian clerics, if not Mashtots himself, must have played a role in the creation of the Georgian script. Ivane Javakhishvili, a Georgian historian and scientist, studied this work of Koryun and concluded that the version of Mesrop Mashtots' creation of the Georgian alphabet is a VI-VII century addition. The 5th-century Armenian historian Ghazar Parpetsi considers Mashtots to be the creator of only the Armenian alphabet. Tamaz Gamkrelidze argues that a thorough linguistic analysis would have been necessary to create a new writing system for the language, while Mesrop Mashtots did not know the Georgian language.

Another controversy regards the main influences at play in the Georgian alphabet, as scholars have debated whether it was inspired more by the Greek alphabet, or by Semitic alphabets such as Aramaic. Recent historiography focuses on greater similarities with the Greek alphabet than in the other Caucasian writing systems, most notably the order and numeric value of letters. Some scholars have also suggested certain pre-Christian Georgian cultural symbols or clan markers as a possible inspiration for particular letters.

== Asomtavruli ==
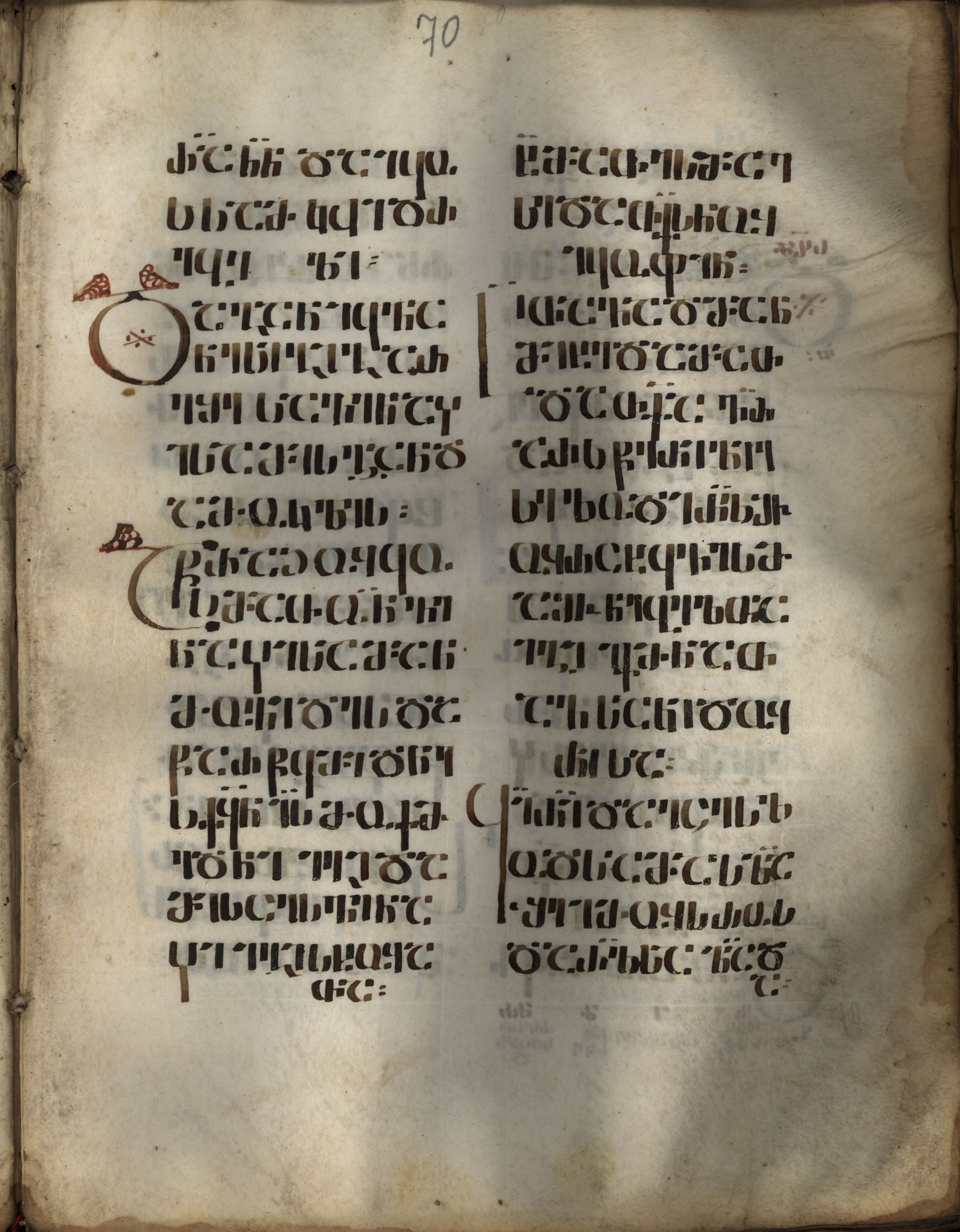
Anbandidi Gospel in Asomtavruli, 9th century.

Asomtavruli (Georgian: ასომთავრული, ႠႱႭႫႧႠႥႰႳႪႨ [asomtʰavɾuli]) is the oldest Georgian script. The name Asomtavruli means "capital letters", from aso (ასო) "letter" and mtavari (მთავარი) "principal/head". It is also known as Mrgvlovani (Georgian: მრგვლოვანი) "rounded", from mrgvali (მრგვალი) "round", so named because of its round letter shapes. Despite its name, this "capital" script is unicameral.

The oldest Asomtavruli inscriptions found so far date from the 5th century and are Bir el Qutt and the Bolnisi inscriptions.

From the 9th century, Nuskhuri script started becoming dominant, and the role of Asomtavruli was reduced. However, epigraphic monuments of the 10th to 18th centuries continued to be written in Asomtavruli script. Asomtavruli in this later period became more decorative. In the majority of 9th-century Georgian manuscripts which were written in Nuskhuri script, Asomtavruli was used for titles and the first letters of chapters. However, some manuscripts written completely in Asomtavruli can be found until the 11th century.

=== Form of Asomtavruli letters ===
In early Asomtavruli, the letters are of equal height. Georgian historian and philologist Pavle Ingorokva believes that the direction of Asomtavruli, like that of Greek, was initially boustrophedon, though the direction of the earliest surviving texts is from left to the right.

In most Asomtavruli letters, straight lines are horizontal or vertical and meet at right angles. The only letter with acute angles is Ⴟ (jani). There have been various attempts to explain this exception. Georgian linguist and art historian Helen Machavariani believes jani derives from a monogram of Christ, composed of Ⴈ (ini) and Ⴕ (kani). According to Georgian scholar Ramaz Pataridze, the cross-like shape of letter jani indicates the end of the alphabet, and has the same function as the similarly shaped Phoenician letter taw, Greek chi (Χ), and Latin X, though these letters do not have that function in Phoenician, Greek, or Latin.

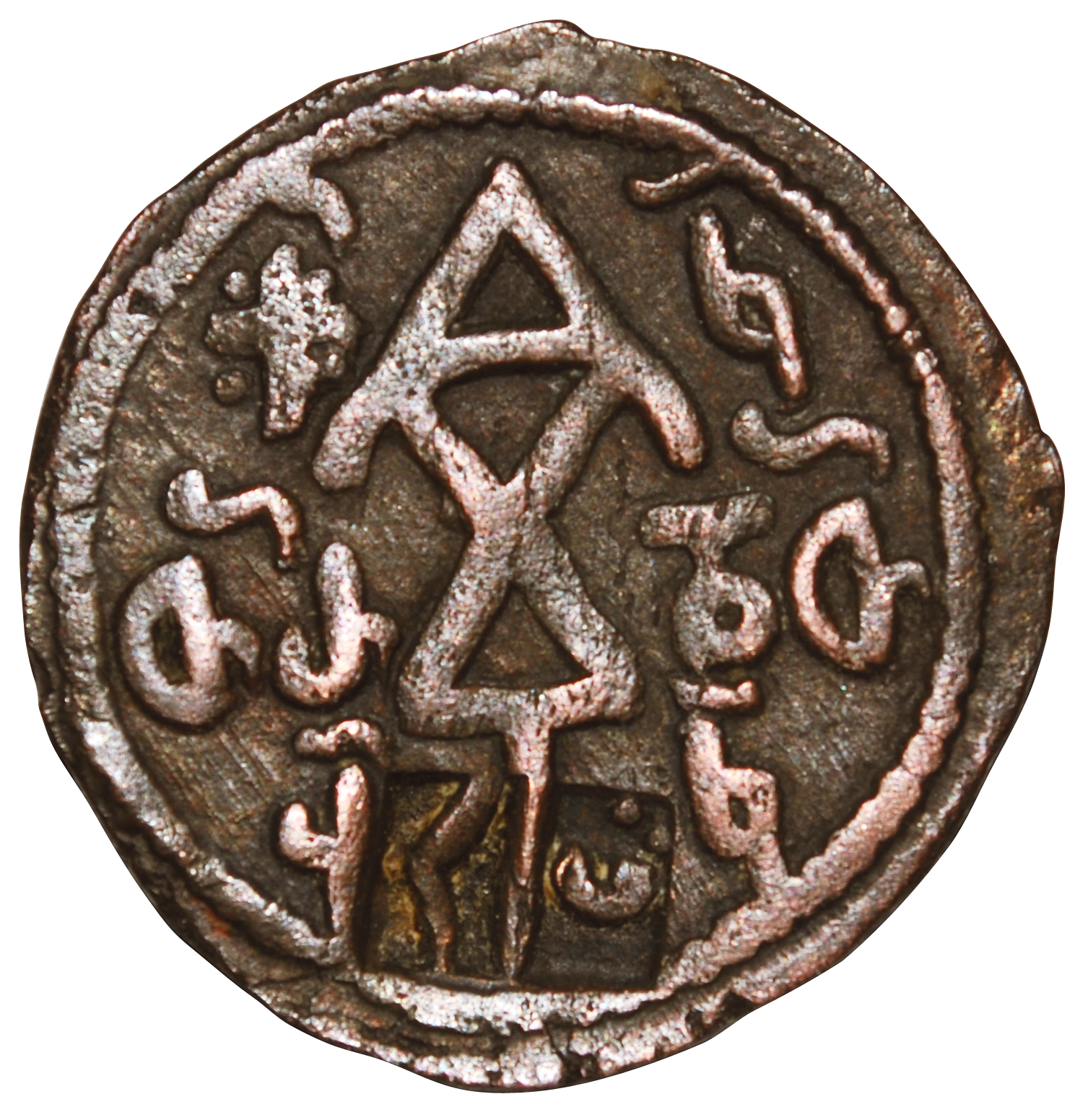
Coins of Queen Tamar of Georgia and King George IV of Georgia minted using Asomtavruli script, 1200–1210 AD.

From the 7th century, the forms of some letters began to change. The equal height of the letters was abandoned, with letters acquiring ascenders and descenders.

Asomtavruli letters
Ⴀ ani	Ⴁ bani	Ⴂ gani	Ⴃ doni	Ⴄ eni	Ⴅ vini	Ⴆ zeni	Ⴡ he	Ⴇ tani	Ⴈ ini	Ⴉ kʼani	Ⴊ lasi	Ⴋ mani	Ⴌ nari	Ⴢ hie	Ⴍ oni	Ⴎ pʼari	Ⴏ zhani	Ⴐ rae
Ⴑ sani	Ⴒ tʼari	Ⴣ vie	Ⴓ/ႭჃ uni	Ⴔ pari	Ⴕ kani	Ⴖ ghani	Ⴗ qʼari	Ⴘ shini	Ⴙ chini	Ⴚ tsani	Ⴛ dzili	Ⴜ ts'ili	Ⴝ ch'ari	Ⴞ khani	Ⴤ qari	Ⴟ jani	Ⴠ hae	Ⴥ hoe

=== Asomtavruli illumination ===
In Nuskhuri manuscripts, Asomtavruli are used for titles and illuminated capitals. The latter were used at the beginnings of paragraphs which started new sections of text. In the early stages of the development of Nuskhuri texts, Asomtavruli letters were not elaborate and were distinguished principally by size and sometimes by being written in cinnabar ink. Later, from the 10th century, the letters were illuminated. The style of Asomtavruli capitals can be used to identify the era of a text. For example, in the Georgian manuscripts of the Byzantine era, when the styles of the Byzantine Empire influenced Kingdom of Georgia, capitals were illuminated with images of birds and other animals.

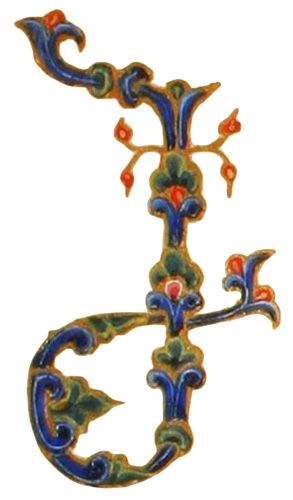
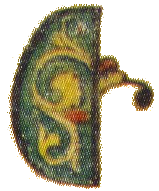
Decorative Asomtavruli capital letters, Ⴋ (m) and Ⴇ (t), 12–13th century.

From the 11th-century "limb-flowery", "limb-arrowy" and "limb-spotty" decorative forms of Asomtavruli are developed. The first two are found in 11th- and 12th-century monuments, whereas the third one is used until the 18th century.

Importance was attached also to the colour of the ink itself.

Asomtavruli letter Ⴃ (doni) is often written with decoration effects of fish and birds.

The "Curly" decorative form of Asomtavruli is also used where the letters are wattled or intermingled on each other, or the smaller letters are written inside other letters. It was mostly used for the headlines of the manuscripts or the books, although there are complete inscriptions which were written in the Asomtavruli "Curly" form only.

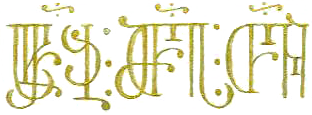
The title of Gospel of Matthew in Asomtavruli "Curly" decorative form.

=== Handwriting of Asomtavruli ===
The following table shows the stroke direction of each Asomtavruli letter:

== Nuskhuri ==
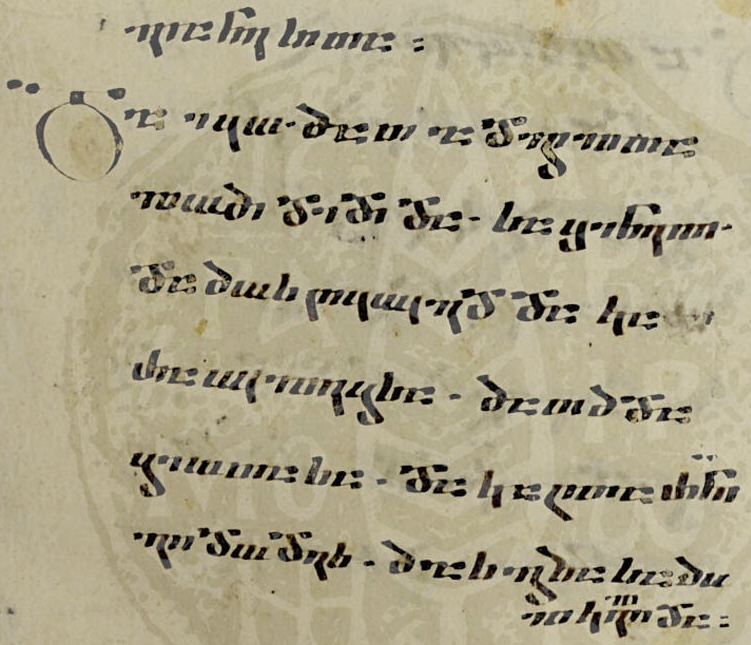
Nuskhuri of John Tornike collection of the Monastery of Iviron, 10th century.

Nuskhuri (Georgian: ნუსხური, ⴌⴓⴑⴞⴓⴐⴈ [nusχuɾi]) is the second Georgian script. The name nuskhuri comes from nuskha (ნუსხა), meaning "inventory" or "schedule". Nuskhuri was soon augmented with Asomtavruli illuminated capitals in religious manuscripts. The combination is called Khutsuri (Georgian: ხუცური, Ⴞⴓⴚⴓⴐⴈ; "clerical", from khutsesi (ხუცესი "cleric"), and it was principally used in hagiography.

Nuskhuri first appeared in the 9th century as a graphic variant of Asomtavruli. The oldest inscription is found in the Ateni Sioni Church and dates to 835 AD. The oldest surviving Nuskhuri manuscripts date to 864 AD. Nuskhuri becomes dominant over Asomtavruli from the 10th century.

=== Form of Nuskhuri letters ===
Nuskhuri letters vary in height, with ascenders and descenders, and are slanted to the right. Letters have an angular shape, with a noticeable tendency to simplify the shapes they had in Asomtavruli. This enabled faster writing of manuscripts.

→ →
Asomtavruli letters ⴍ (oni) and ⴣ (vie). A ligature of these letters produced a new letter in Nuskhuri, ⴓ uni.
A colophon of King David IV in Nuskhuri.

Nuskhuri letters
ⴀ ani	ⴁ bani	ⴂ gani	ⴃ doni	ⴄ eni	ⴅ vini	ⴆ zeni	ⴡ he	ⴇ tani	ⴈ ini	ⴉ kʼani	ⴊ lasi	ⴋ mani	ⴌ nari	ⴢ hie	ⴍ oni	ⴎ pʼari	ⴏ zhani	ⴐ rae
ⴑ sani	ⴒ tʼari	ⴣ vie	ⴓ/ⴍⴣ uni	ⴔ pari	ⴕ kani	ⴖ ghani	ⴗ qʼari	ⴘ shini	ⴙ chini	ⴚ tsani	ⴛ dzili	ⴜ tsʼili	ⴝ chʼari	ⴞ khani	ⴤ qari	ⴟ jani	ⴠ hae	ⴥ hoe

Note: Without proper font support, you may see question marks, boxes or other symbols instead of Nuskhuri letters.

=== Handwriting of Nuskhuri ===
The following table shows the stroke direction of each Nuskhuri letter:

== Use of Asomtavruli and Nuskhuri today ==
Asomtavruli is used intensively in iconography, murals, and exterior design, especially in stone engravings. Georgian linguist Akaki Shanidze made an attempt in the 1950s to introduce Asomtavruli into the Mkhedruli script as capital letters to begin sentences, as in the Latin script, but it did not catch on. Asomtavruli and Nuskhuri are officially used by the Georgian Orthodox Church alongside Mkhedruli. Patriarch Ilia II of Georgia called on people to use all three Georgian scripts.

== Mkhedruli ==
Royal charter of King Bagrat IV in Mkhedruli, 11th century.

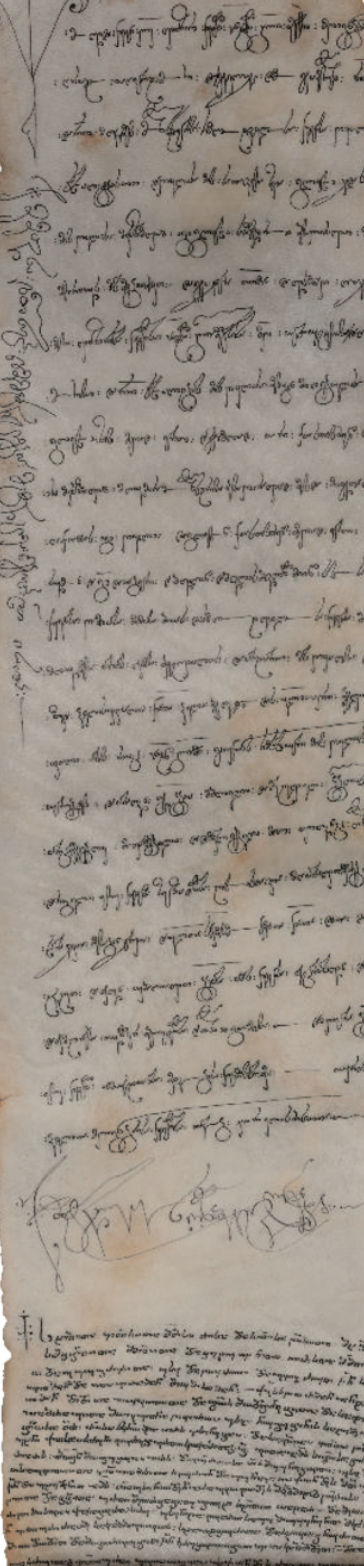
Royal charter of Queen Tamar of Georgia in Mkhedruli, 1202 AD.

Royal charter of King Vakhtang VI in Mkhedruli, 1725 AD.

Mkhedruli (Georgian: მხედრული [mχedɾuli]) is the third and current Georgian script. Mkhedruli, literally meaning "cavalry" or "military", derives from mkhedari (მხედარი) meaning "horseman", "knight", "warrior" and "cavalier".

Mkhedruli first appears in the 10th century. The oldest Mkhedruli inscription is found in Ateni Sioni Church dating back to 982 AD. The second oldest Mkhedruli-written text is found in the 11th-century royal charters of King Bagrat IV of Georgia. Mkhedruli was mostly used then in the Kingdom of Georgia for the royal charters, historical documents, manuscripts and inscriptions. Mkhedruli was used for non-religious purposes only and represented the "civil", "royal" and "secular" script.

Mkhedruli became more and more dominant over the two other scripts, though Khutsuri (Nuskhuri with Asomtavruli) was used until the 19th century. Mkhedruli became the universal writing Georgian system outside of the Church in the 19th century with the establishment and development of printed Georgian fonts.

Mkhedruli is potentially a bicameral script, with capital letters that are called Mkhedruli Mtavruli (მხედრული მთავრული) or simply Mtavruli (მთავრული; Georgian pronunciation: [mtʰavɾuli]). Nowadays Mkhedruli Mtavruli is only used in all-caps text in titles or to emphasize a word, though in the late 19th and early 20th centuries it was occasionally used, as in Latin and Cyrillic scripts, to capitalize proper nouns or the first word of a sentence. Contemporary Georgian script does not recognize capital letters and their usage has become decorative.

=== Form of Mkhedruli letters ===
Mkhedruli inscriptions of the 10th and 11th centuries are characterized in rounding of angular shapes of Nuskhuri letters and making the complete outlines in all of its letters. Mkhedruli letters are written in the four-linear system, similar to Nuskhuri. Mkhedruli becomes more round and free in writing. It breaks the strict frame of the previous two alphabets, Asomtavruli and Nuskhuri. Mkhedruli letters begin to get coupled and more free calligraphy develops.

Example of one of the oldest Mkhedruli-written texts found in the royal charter of King Bagrat IV of Georgia, 11th century.

"Gurgen : King : of Kings : great-grandfather : of mine : Bagrat Curopalates"

Coin of Queen Tamar of Georgia in Mkhedruli, 1187 AD.

=== Modern Georgian alphabet ===
The modern Georgian alphabet consists of 33 letters:

ა ani	ბ bani	გ gani	დ doni	ე eni	ვ vini	ზ zeni	თ tani	ი ini	კ k'ani	ლ lasi
მ mani	ნ nari	ო oni	პ p'ari	ჟ zhani	რ rae	ს sani	ტ t'ari	უ uni	ფ pari	ქ kani
ღ ghani	ყ q'ari	შ shini	ჩ chini	ც tsani	ძ dzili	წ ts'ili	ჭ ch'ari	ხ khani	ჯ jani	ჰ hae

=== Letters removed from the Georgian alphabet ===
The Society for the Spreading of Literacy among Georgians, founded by Prince Ilia Chavchavadze in 1879, discarded five letters from the Georgian alphabet that had become redundant:

ჱ e-merve	ჲ iota	ჳ vie	ჴ khari	ჵ hoe

- ჱ (Georgian: ე-მერვე, romanized: e-merve "eighth e") /e̞j/ (roughly like the ⟨ay⟩ in pay), Svan /eː/ (like the e in egg in some American and Canadian accents), sometimes called "ei", was equivalent to ეჲ ey, as in ქრისტჱ ~ ქრისტეჲ kristʼey 'Christ'.
- ჲ (Georgian: იოტა, romanized: iot'a) /j/ (like the word "yeah"), appeared for the sound /j/ after a vowel (დედაჲ deday "mother", რაჲ ray "what"), but was dropped from the pronunciation and abolished from the spelling. Thus, ქრისტჱ ~ ქრისტეჲ kristʼey "Christ" is now written ქრისტე kristʼe.
- ჳ (Georgian: ვიე, romanized: vie) /wi~vi/ (like a cluster of the oo in too and the i in ill), Svan /w/ (like the w in water) came to be pronounced the same as ვი vi and was replaced by that sequence, as in სხჳსი > სხვისი skhvisi "others'".
- ჴ (Georgian: ხარი/ჴარი, romanized: khari/ẖari, qari, hari) /q⁽ʰ⁾/ (like the Arabic Qof) came to be pronounced the same as ხ (khani), and was replaced by it. e.g. ჴელმწიფე qelmtsʼipe became ხელმწიფე khelmtsʼipe "sovereign".
- ჵ (Georgian: ჰოე, romanized: hoe) /oː/ (somewhat like the American o in go) was used for the interjection hoi! and is now spelled ჰოი. Also used in Bats for the /ʕ/ or /ɦ/ sound.

All but ჵ (hoe) continue to be used in the Svan alphabet; ჲ (hie) is used in the Mingrelian and Laz alphabets as well, for the y-sound /j/. Several others were used for Abkhaz and Ossetian in the short time they were written in Mkhedruli script.

=== Letters added to other alphabets ===
Mkhedruli has been adapted to languages besides Georgian. Some of these alphabets retained letters obsolete in Georgian, while others acquired additional letters:

ჶ fi	ჷ shva	ჸ elifi	ჹ turned gani	ჺ aini	ჼ modifier letter nar	ჽ aen	ჾ hard sign	ჿ labial sign

- ჶ (fi "phi") is used in Laz and Svan, and formerly in Ossetian and Abkhazian. It is used for foreign names in Georgian. It derives from the Greek letter Φ (phi).
- ჷ (shva "schwa"), also called yn, is used for the schwa sound in Svan and Mingrelian, and formerly in Ossetian and Abkhazian.
- ჸ (elifi "alif") is used in for the glottal stop in Svan and Mingrelian, as well as in the Tushetian dialect of Georgian. It is a reversed ⟨ყ⟩ (q'ari).
- ჹ (turned gani) was once used for [ɢ] in evangelical literature in Dagestanian languages.
- ჼ (modifier nar) is used in Bats. It nasalizes the preceding vowel.
- ჺ (aini "ain") is occasionally used for [ʕ] in Bats. It derives from the Arabic letter ⟨ع⟩ (ʿayn)
- ჽ (aen) was used in the Ossetian language when it was written in the Georgian script. It was pronounced [ə].
- ჾ (hard sign) was used in Abkhaz for velarization of the preceding consonant.
- ჿ (labial sign) was used in Abkhaz for labialization of the preceding consonant.

=== Handwriting of Mkhedruli ===
The following table shows the stroke order and direction of each Mkhedruli letter:

ზ, ო, and ხ (zeni, oni, khani) are almost always written without the small tick at the end, while the handwritten form of ჯ (jani) often uses a vertical line, (sometimes with a taller ascender, or with a diagonal cross bar); even when it is written at a diagonal, the cross-bar is generally shorter than in print.

- Only four letters are x-height, with neither ascenders nor descenders: ა, თ, ი, ო.
- Thirteen have ascenders, like b or d in English: ბ, ზ, მ, ნ, პ, რ, ს, შ, ჩ, ძ, წ, ხ, ჰ
- An equal number have descenders, like p or q in English: გ, დ, ე, ვ, კ, ლ, ჟ, ტ, უ, ფ, ღ, ყ, ც
- Three letters have both ascenders and descenders, like þ in Old English: ქ, ჭ, and (in handwriting) ჯ. წ sometimes has both ascender and descender in handwriting.

==== Variation ====
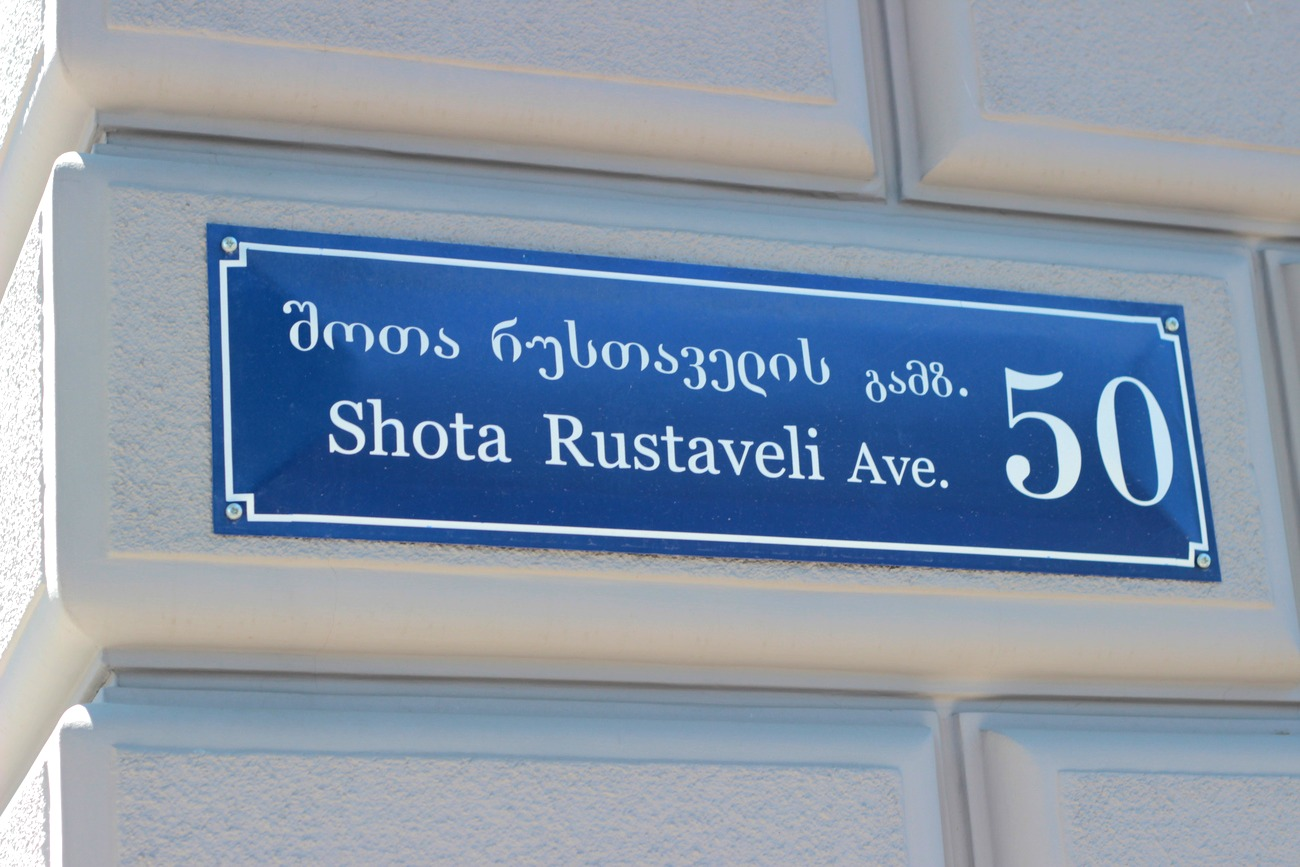
Stylistic variation of letters რ and ლ on a street name sign for Rustaveli Avenue, showing variations in the name Rustaveli, with რუსთაველის resembling ɦუსთავეჺის.

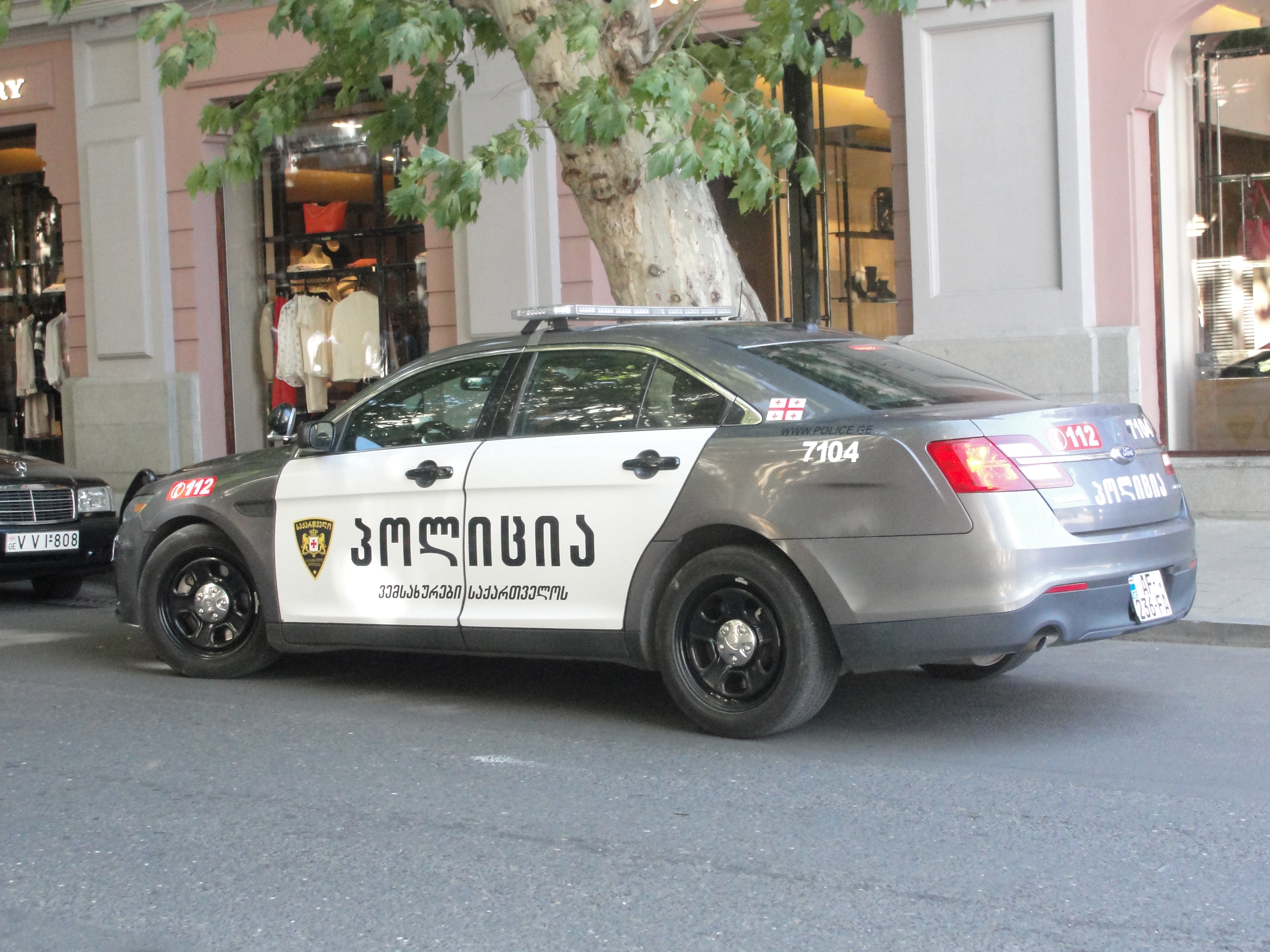
Mtavruli, i.e. all-caps text, on a Georgian police car

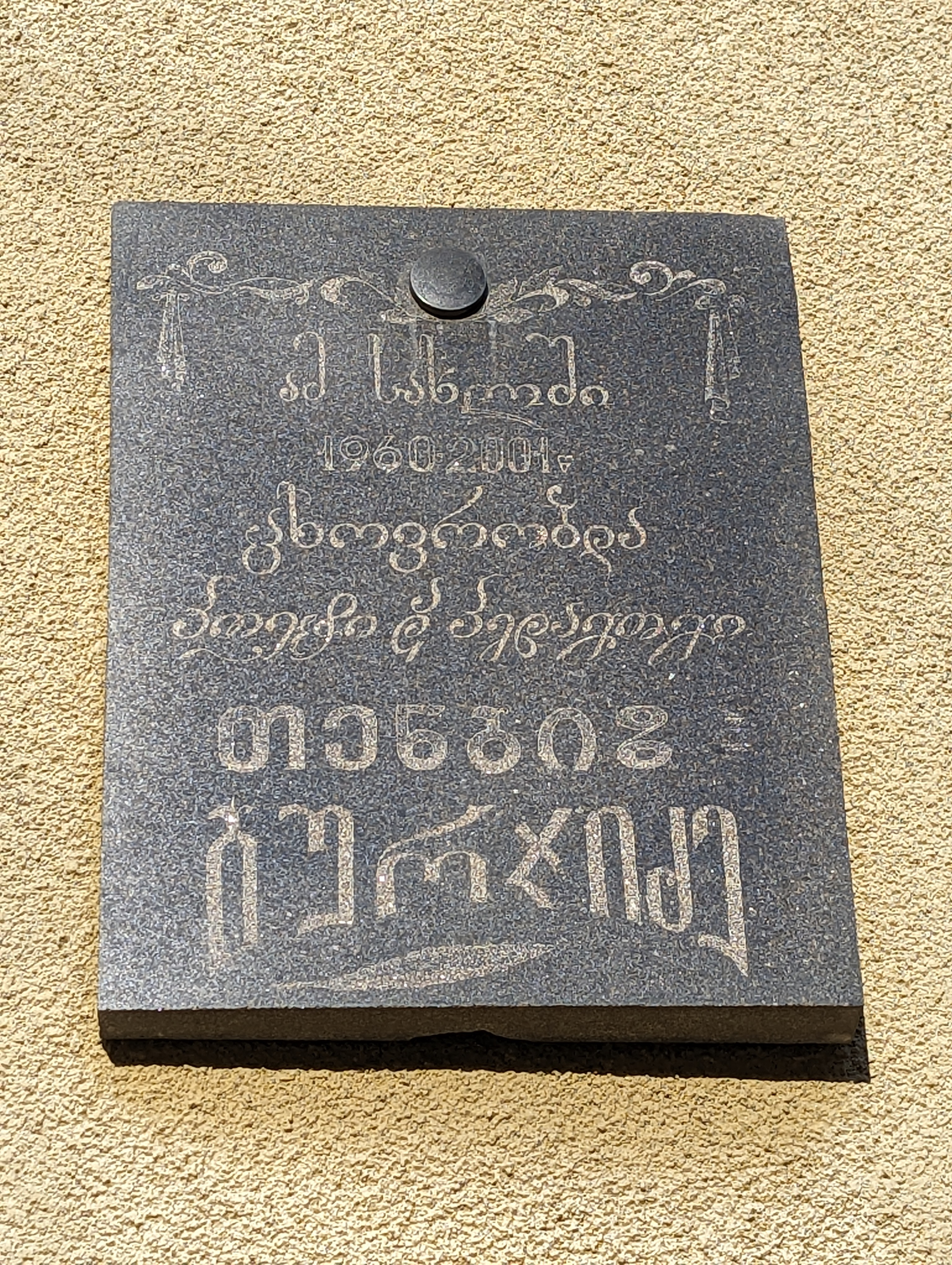
A commemorative plaque using Mkhedruli for the upper four lines and Mtavruli for the lower two, with each line written in a different typeface and showing variant glyphs, like დ with a single curl and ჯ with reduced second stroke. A ligature of და ("and") with ა placed above დ can be seen in the fourth line.

There is individual and stylistic variation in many of the letters. For example, the top circle of ზ (zeni) and the top stroke of რ (rae) may go in the other direction than shown in the chart (that is, counter-clockwise starting at 3 o'clock, and upwards – see the external-link section for videos of people writing).

Other common variants:

- გ (gani) may be written like ვ (vini) with a closed loop at the bottom.
- დ (doni) is frequently written with a simple loop at top,.
- კ, ც, and ძ (k'ani, tsani, dzili) are generally written with straight, vertical lines at the top, so that for example ც (tsani) resembles a U with a dimple in the right side.
- ლ (lasi) is frequently written with a single arc,, a little like a Greek rho symbol ⟨ϱ⟩. Even when all three are written, they're generally not all the same size, as they are in print, but rather riding on one wide arc like two dimples in it.
- Rarely, ო (oni) is written as a right angle,.
- რ (rae) is frequently written with one arc,, like a Latin ⟨h⟩.
- ტ (t'ari) often has a small circle with a tail hanging into the bowl, rather than two small circles as in print, or as an O with a straight vertical line intersecting the top. It may also be rotated a bit clockwise, with the small circles further to the right and not as close to the top.
- წ (ts'ili) is generally written with a round bowl at the bottom,. Another variation features a triangular bowl.
- ჭ (ch'ari) may be written without the hook at the top, and often with a completely straight vertical line.
- ჱ (he) may be written without the loop, like a conflation of ს and ჰ.
- ჯ (jani) is sometimes written so that it looks like a hooked version of the Latin ⟨X⟩.

==== Similar letters ====
Several letters are similar and may be confused at first, especially in handwriting.

- For ვ (vini) and კ (k'ani), the distinguishing factor is whether the top is a full arc or a (more-or-less) vertical line.
- For ვ (vini) and გ (gani), the distinguishing factor is whether the bottom is an open curve or closed (a loop). The same is true of უ (uni) and შ (shini); in handwriting, the tops may look the same. Similarly ს (sani) and ხ (khani).
- For კ (k'ani) and პ (p'ari), the distinguishing factor is whether the letter is written below or above x-height, and whether it's written top-down or bottom-up. In Mtavruli, all letters have the same height and vertical positioning, so these differences disappear; as a result, Კ (k'ani) and Პ (p'ari) can only be distinguished by the length and slight curving of the upper stroke.
- For მ (mani) and ძ (dzili), the distinguishing factor is ძ (dzili) is written with a vertical top.

== Ligatures, abbreviations and calligraphy ==
Asomtavruli is often highly stylized and writers readily formed ligatures, intertwined letters, and placed letters within letters or other such monograms.

A ligature of the Asomtavruli letters Ⴃ Ⴀ (და, da) "and"

Nuskhuri, like Asomtavruli, is also often highly stylized. Writers readily formed ligatures and abbreviations for nomina sacra, including diacritics called karagma, which resemble titla. Because writing materials such as vellum were scarce and therefore precious, abbreviating was a practical measure widespread in manuscripts and hagiography by the 11th century.

A Nuskhuri abbreviation of რომელი (romeli) "which"
A Nuskhuri abbreviation of იესუ ქრისტე (iesu kriste) "Jesus Christ"

Mkhedruli, in the 11th to 17th centuries, also came to employ digraphs to the point that they were obligatory, requiring adherence to a complex system.

A Mkhedruli ligature of და (da) "and"
Mkhedruli calligraphy of Prince Garsevan Chavchavadze and King Archil II

== Typefaces ==
Georgian scripts come in only a single type face, though word processors can apply automatic ("fake") oblique and bold formatting to Georgian text. Traditionally, Asomtavruli was used for chapter or section titles, where Latin script might use bold or italic type.

== Punctuation ==
In Asomtavruli and Nuskhuri punctuation, various combinations of dots were used as word dividers and to separate phrases, clauses, and paragraphs. In monumental inscriptions and manuscripts of 5th to 10th centuries, these were written as dashes, like −, = and =−. In the 10th century, clusters of one (·), two (:), three (჻) and six (჻჻) dots (later sometimes small circles) were introduced by Ephrem Mtsire to indicate increasing breaks in the text. One dot indicated a "minor stop" (presumably a simple word break), two dots marked or separated "special words", three dots for a "bigger stop" (such as the appositive name and title "the sovereign Alexander", below, or the title of the Gospel of Matthew, above), and six dots were to indicate the end of the sentence. Starting in the 11th century, marks resembling the apostrophe and comma came into use. An apostrophe was used to mark an interrogative word, and a comma appeared at the end of an interrogative sentence. From the 12th century on, these were replaced with the semicolon (the Greek question mark). In the 18th century, Patriarch Anton I of Georgia reformed the system again, with commas, single dots, and double dots used to mark "complete", "incomplete", and "final" sentences, respectively. For the most part, Georgian today uses the punctuation as in international usage of the Latin script.

Signature of King Alexander II of Kakheti, with the divider ⟨჻⟩
ჴლმწიფე ჻ ალექსანდრე
"The sovereign Alexander"

== Summary ==
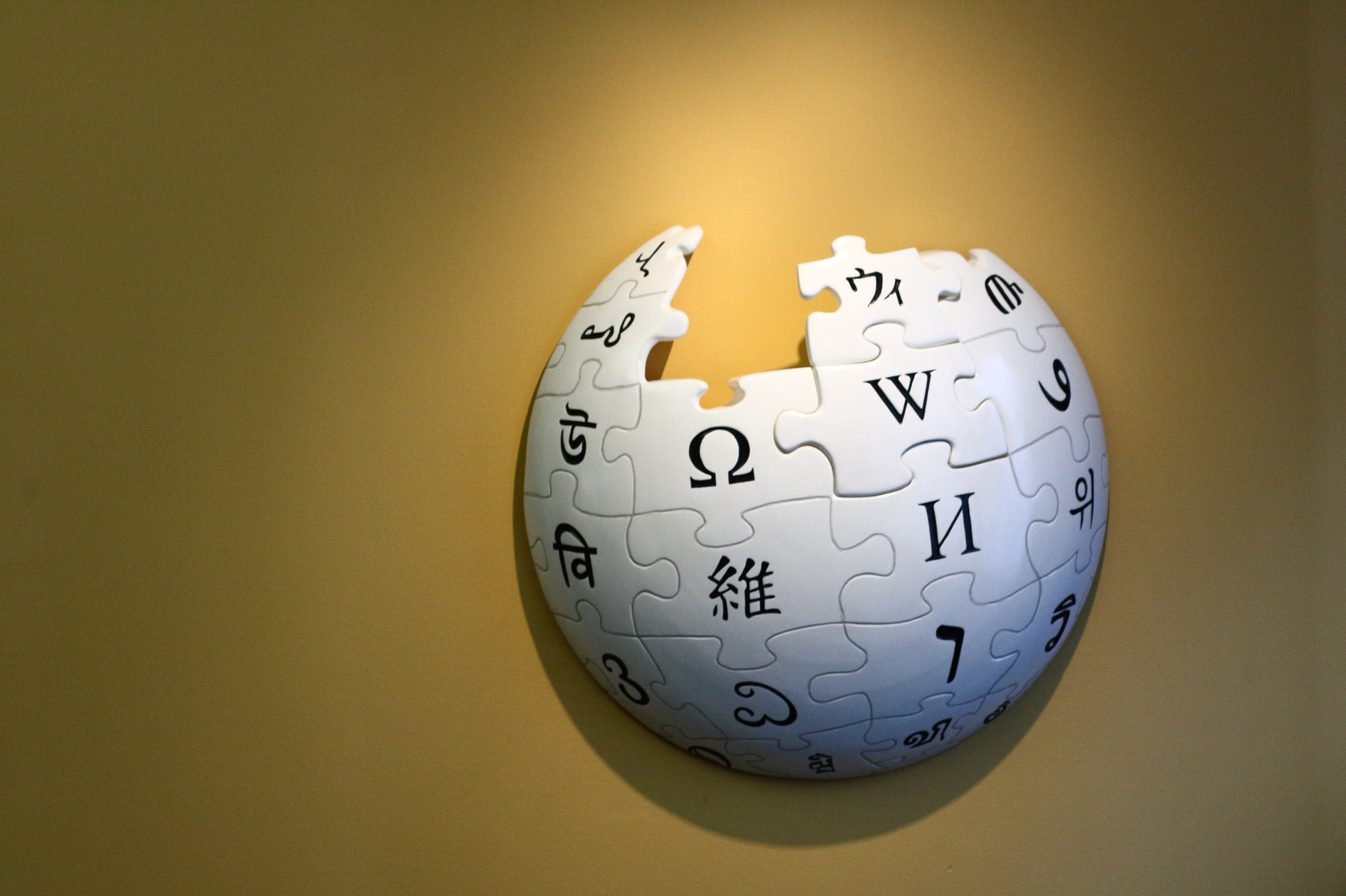
The Georgian letter ⟨ვ⟩ is on the Wikipedia logo (lower left).

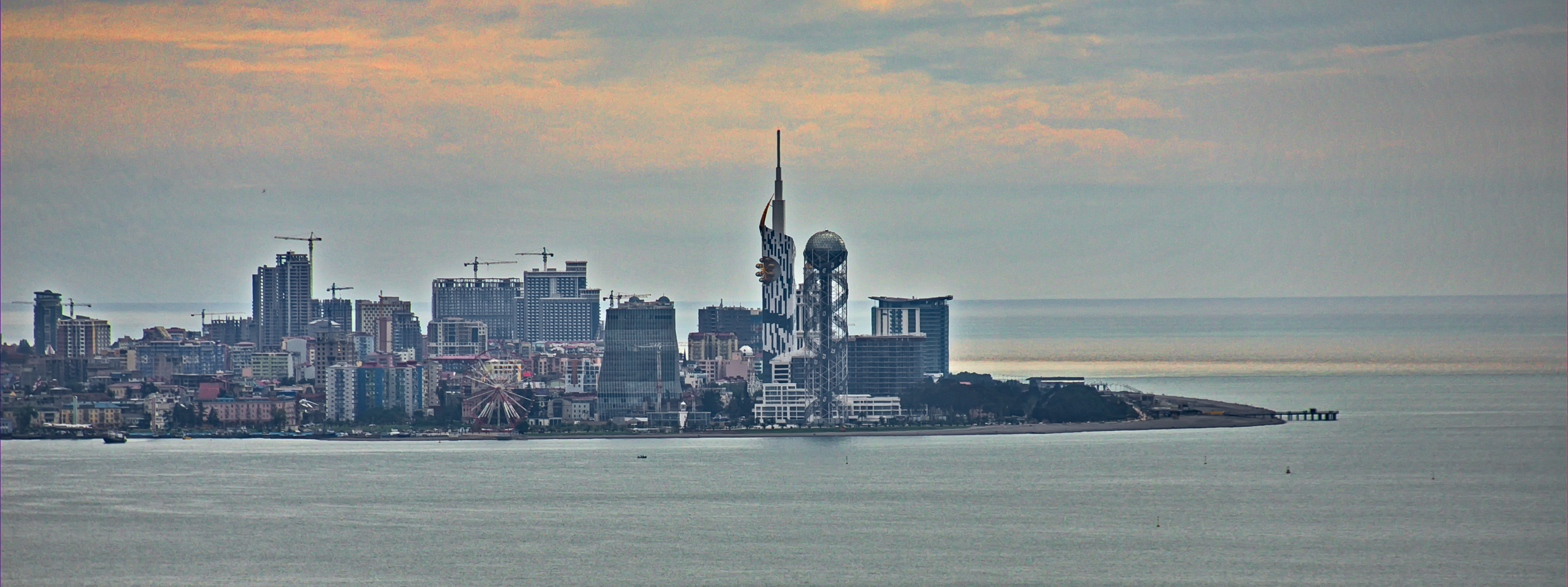
The Alphabetic Tower seen on panorama of Georgia's port city of Batumi

This table lists the three scripts in parallel columns, including the letters that are now obsolete in all alphabets (shown with a blue background), obsolete in Georgian but still used in other alphabets (green background), or additional letters in languages other than Georgian (pink background). The "national" transliteration is the system used by the Georgian government, whereas "Laz" is the Latin Laz alphabet used in Turkey. The table also shows the traditional numeric values of the letters.

Letters				Unicode (mkhedruli)	Name	IPA	Transcriptions				Numeric value
asomtavruli	nuskhuri	mkhedruli	mtavruli	Unicode (mkhedruli)	Name	IPA	National	ISO 9984	BGN	Laz	Numeric value
Ⴀ	ⴀ	ა	Ა	U+10D0	ani	/ɑ/, Svan /a, æ/	A a	A a	A a	A a	1
Ⴁ	ⴁ	ბ	Ბ	U+10D1	bani	/b/	B b	B b	B b	B b	2
Ⴂ	ⴂ	გ	Გ	U+10D2	gani	/ɡ/	G g	G g	G g	G g	3
Ⴃ	ⴃ	დ	Დ	U+10D3	doni	/d/	D d	D d	D d	D d	4
Ⴄ	ⴄ	ე	Ე	U+10D4	eni	/ɛ/	E e	E e	E e	E e	5
Ⴅ	ⴅ	ვ	Ვ	U+10D5	vini	/v/	V v	V v	V v	V v	6
Ⴆ	ⴆ	ზ	Ზ	U+10D6	zeni	/z/	Z z	Z z	Z z	Z z	7
Ⴡ	ⴡ	ჱ	Ჱ	U+10F1	he	/eɪ/, Svan /eː/	—	Ē ē	Ey ey	—	8
Ⴇ	ⴇ	თ	Თ	U+10D7	tani	/t⁽ʰ⁾/	T t	Tʼ tʼ	Tʼ tʼ	T t	9
Ⴈ	ⴈ	ი	Ი	U+10D8	ini	/i/	I i	I i	I i	I i	10
Ⴉ	ⴉ	კ	Კ	U+10D9	kʼani	/kʼ/	Kʼ kʼ	K k	K k	Ǩ ǩ	20
Ⴊ	ⴊ	ლ	Ლ	U+10DA	lasi	/l/	L l	L l	L l	L l	30
Ⴋ	ⴋ	მ	Მ	U+10DB	mani	/m/	M m	M m	M m	M m	40
Ⴌ	ⴌ	ნ	Ნ	U+10DC	nari	/n/	N n	N n	N n	N n	50
Ⴢ	ⴢ	ჲ	Ჲ	U+10F2	hie	/je/, Mingrelian, Laz, & Svan /j/	—	Y y	J j	Y y	60
Ⴍ	ⴍ	ო	Ო	U+10DD	oni	/ɔ/, Svan /ɔ, œ/	O o	O o	O o	O o	70
Ⴎ	ⴎ	პ	Პ	U+10DE	pʼari	/pʼ/	Pʼ pʼ	P p	P p	P̌ p̌	80
Ⴏ	ⴏ	ჟ	Ჟ	U+10DF	zhani	/ʒ/	Zh zh	Ž ž	Zh zh	J j	90
Ⴐ	ⴐ	რ	Რ	U+10E0	rae	/r/	R r	R r	R r	R r	100
Ⴑ	ⴑ	ს	Ს	U+10E1	sani	/s/	S s	S s	S s	S s	200
Ⴒ	ⴒ	ტ	Ტ	U+10E2	tʼari	/tʼ/	Tʼ tʼ	T t	T t	Ť t͏̌	300
Ⴣ	ⴣ	ჳ	Ჳ	U+10F3	vie	/uɪ/, Svan /w/	—	W w	—	—	400 (Note: ჳ and უ have the same numeric value (400))
Ⴓ	ⴓ	უ	Უ	U+10E3	uni	/u/, Svan /u, y/	U u	U u	U u	U u	400
Ⴧ	ⴧ	ჷ	Ჷ	U+10F7	yn, schva	Mingrelian & Svan /ə/	—	—	—	—	—
Ⴔ	ⴔ	ფ	Ფ	U+10E4	pari	/p⁽ʰ⁾/	P p	Pʼ pʼ	Pʼ pʼ	P p	500
Ⴕ	ⴕ	ქ	Ქ	U+10E5	kani	/k⁽ʰ⁾/	K k	Kʼ kʼ	Kʼ kʼ	K k	600
Ⴖ	ⴖ	ღ	Ღ	U+10E6	ghani	/ɣ/	Gh gh	Ḡ ḡ	Gh gh	Ğ ğ	700
Ⴗ	ⴗ	ყ	Ყ	U+10E7	qʼari	/qʼ/	Qʼ qʼ	Q q	Q q	Q q	800
—	—	ჸ	Ჸ	U+10F8	elif	Mingrelian & Svan /ʔ/	—	—	—	—	—
Ⴘ	ⴘ	შ	Შ	U+10E8	shini	/ʃ/	Sh sh	Š š	Sh sh	Ş ş	900
Ⴙ	ⴙ	ჩ	Ჩ	U+10E9	chini	/tʃ⁽ʰ⁾/	Ch ch	Čʼ čʼ	Chʼ chʼ	Ç ç	1000
Ⴚ	ⴚ	ც	Ც	U+10EA	tsani	/ts⁽ʰ⁾/	Ts ts	Cʼ cʼ	Tsʼ tsʼ	Ʒ ʒ	2000
Ⴛ	ⴛ	ძ	Ძ	U+10EB	dzili	/dz/	Dz dz	J j	Dz dz	Ž ž	3000
Ⴜ	ⴜ	წ	Წ	U+10EC	tsʼili	/tsʼ/	Tsʼ tsʼ	C c	Ts ts	Ǯ ǯ	4000
Ⴝ	ⴝ	ჭ	Ჭ	U+10ED	chʼari	/tʃʼ/	Chʼ chʼ	Č č	Ch ch	Ç̌ ç̌	5000
Ⴞ	ⴞ	ხ	Ხ	U+10EE	khani	/χ/	Kh kh	X x	Kh kh	X x	6000
Ⴤ	ⴤ	ჴ	Ჴ	U+10F4	qari, hari	/q⁽ʰ⁾/	—	H̱ ẖ	qʼ	—	7000
Ⴟ	ⴟ	ჯ	Ჯ	U+10EF	jani	/dʒ/	J j	J̌ ǰ	J j	C c	8000
Ⴠ	ⴠ	ჰ	Ჰ	U+10F0	hae	/h/	H h	H h	H h	H h	9000
Ⴥ	ⴥ	ჵ	Ჵ	U+10F5	hoe	/oː/, Bats /ʕ, ɦ/	—	Ō ō	—	—	10000
—	—	ჶ	Ჶ	U+10F6	fi	Laz /f/	—	F f	—	F f	—
—	—	ჹ	Ჹ	U+10F9	turned gani	Dagestanian languages /ɢ/ in evangelical literature	—	—	—	—	—
—	—	ჺ	Ჺ	U+10FA	aini	Bats /ʕ/	—	—	—	—	—
—	—	ჼ	—	U+10FC	modifier nar	Bats [◌̃] nasalization of preceding vowel	—	—	—	—	—
Ⴭ	ⴭ	ჽ	Ჽ	U+10FD	aen	Ossetian /ə/	—	—	—	—	—
—	—	ჾ	Ჾ	U+10FE	hard sign	Abkhaz velarization of preceding consonant	—	—	—	—	—
—	—	ჿ	Ჿ	U+10FF	labial sign	Abkhaz labialization of preceding consonant	—	—	—	—	—

== Use for other non-Kartvelian languages ==
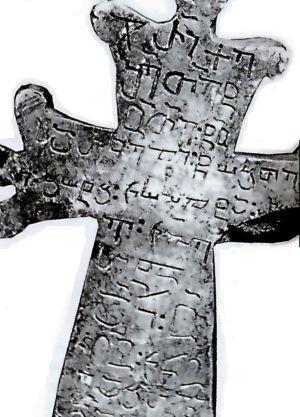
Old Avar cross with Avar inscriptions in Asomtavruli script (left). Ossetian text written in Mkhedruli script, from a book on Ossetian folklore published in South Ossetia in 1940. The non-Georgian letters ჶ [f] and ჷ [ə] can be seen.

=== Northwest Caucasian languages ===
- Abkhaz until the 1940s.
- Circassian (historically), later replaced in the 17th century by Arabic and by the Cyrillic script in the 20th century.

=== Northeast Caucasian languages ===
- Ingush (historically), later replaced in the 17th century by Arabic and by the Cyrillic script in the 20th century.
- Chechen (historically), later replaced in the 17th century by Arabic and by the Cyrillic script in the 20th century.
- Avar (historically), later replaced in the 17th century by Arabic and by the Cyrillic script in the 20th century.
- Other Northeast Caucasian languages; the Georgian script was used for writing North Caucasian and Dagestani languages in connection with Georgian missionary activities in the areas starting in the 18th century.

=== Indo-European languages ===
- Ossetian until the 1940s.
- Persian; the 18th-century Persian translation of the Arabic Gospel is kept at the National Center of Manuscripts in Tbilisi.
- Armenian; in the Armenian community in Tbilisi, the Georgian script was occasionally used for writing Armenian in the 18th and 19th centuries, and some samples of this kind of texts are kept at the Georgian National Center of Manuscripts in Tbilisi.
- Russian; in the collections of the National Center of Manuscripts in Tbilisi there are also a few short poems in the Russian language written in Georgian script dating from the late 18th and early 19th centuries.

=== Turkic languages ===
- Turkish; a Turkish Gospel, dictionary, poems, medical book dating from the 18th century.
- Azerbaijani; used by Azeris in Georgia.

== Computing ==
The Georgian letter ⟨ღ⟩ (ghani) is often used as a love or heart symbol online.

The Georgian letter ⟨ლ⟩ (lasi) is sometimes used as a hand or fist in emoticons ( ex: ლ(╹◡╹ლ) ).

=== Unicode ===
The first Georgian script was included in Unicode Standard in October 1991 with the release of version 1.0. In creating the Georgian Unicode block, important roles were played by German Jost Gippert, a linguist of Kartvelian studies, and American-Irish linguist and script-encoder Michael Everson, who created the Georgian Unicode for the Macintosh systems. Significant contributions were also made by Anton Dumbadze and Irakli Garibashvili (not to be mistaken with the former Prime Minister of Georgia Irakli Garibashvili).

Georgian Mkhedruli script received an official status for being Georgia's internationalized domain name script for (.გე).

Mtavruli letters were added in Unicode version 11.0 in June 2018. They are capital letters with similar letterforms to Mkhedruli, but with descenders shifted above the baseline, with a wider central oval, and with the top slightly higher than the ascender height. Before this addition, font creators included Mtavruli in various ways. Some fonts came in pairs, of which one had lowercase letters and the other uppercase; some Unicode fonts placed Mtavruli letterforms in the Asomtavruli range (U+10A0-U+10CF) or in the Private Use Area, and some ASCII-based ones mapped them to the ASCII capital letters.

==== Blocks ====
Georgian characters are found in three Unicode blocks. The first block (U+10A0–U+10FF) is simply called Georgian. Mkhedruli (modern Georgian) occupies the U+10D0–U+10FF range (shown in the bottom half of the first table below) and Asomtavruli occupies the U+10A0–U+10CF range (shown in the top half of the same table). The second block is the Georgian Supplement (U+2D00–U+2D2F), and it contains Nuskhuri. Mtavruli capitals are included in the Georgian Extended block (U+1C90–U+1CBF).

Mtavruli is defined as the upper case, but not title case, of Mkhedruli, and Asomtavruli as the upper case and title case of Nuskhuri.

Georgian^{[1]}^{[2]} Official Unicode Consortium code chart (PDF)
	0	1	2	3	4	5	6	7	8	9	A	B	C	D	E	F
U+10Ax	Ⴀ	Ⴁ	Ⴂ	Ⴃ	Ⴄ	Ⴅ	Ⴆ	Ⴇ	Ⴈ	Ⴉ	Ⴊ	Ⴋ	Ⴌ	Ⴍ	Ⴎ	Ⴏ
U+10Bx	Ⴐ	Ⴑ	Ⴒ	Ⴓ	Ⴔ	Ⴕ	Ⴖ	Ⴗ	Ⴘ	Ⴙ	Ⴚ	Ⴛ	Ⴜ	Ⴝ	Ⴞ	Ⴟ
U+10Cx	Ⴠ	Ⴡ	Ⴢ	Ⴣ	Ⴤ	Ⴥ		Ⴧ						Ⴭ		
U+10Dx	ა	ბ	გ	დ	ე	ვ	ზ	თ	ი	კ	ლ	მ	ნ	ო	პ	ჟ
U+10Ex	რ	ს	ტ	უ	ფ	ქ	ღ	ყ	შ	ჩ	ც	ძ	წ	ჭ	ხ	ჯ
U+10Fx	ჰ	ჱ	ჲ	ჳ	ჴ	ჵ	ჶ	ჷ	ჸ	ჹ	ჺ	჻	ჼ	ჽ	ჾ	ჿ
Notes 1.As of Unicode version 18.0 2.Grey areas indicate non-assigned code points

Georgian Supplement^{[1]}^{[2]} Official Unicode Consortium code chart (PDF)
	0	1	2	3	4	5	6	7	8	9	A	B	C	D	E	F
U+2D0x	ⴀ	ⴁ	ⴂ	ⴃ	ⴄ	ⴅ	ⴆ	ⴇ	ⴈ	ⴉ	ⴊ	ⴋ	ⴌ	ⴍ	ⴎ	ⴏ
U+2D1x	ⴐ	ⴑ	ⴒ	ⴓ	ⴔ	ⴕ	ⴖ	ⴗ	ⴘ	ⴙ	ⴚ	ⴛ	ⴜ	ⴝ	ⴞ	ⴟ
U+2D2x	ⴠ	ⴡ	ⴢ	ⴣ	ⴤ	ⴥ		ⴧ						ⴭ		
Notes 1.As of Unicode version 18.0 2.Grey areas indicate non-assigned code points

Georgian Extended^{[1]}^{[2]} Official Unicode Consortium code chart (PDF)
	0	1	2	3	4	5	6	7	8	9	A	B	C	D	E	F
U+1C9x	Ა	Ბ	Გ	Დ	Ე	Ვ	Ზ	Თ	Ი	Კ	Ლ	Მ	Ნ	Ო	Პ	Ჟ
U+1CAx	Რ	Ს	Ტ	Უ	Ფ	Ქ	Ღ	Ყ	Შ	Ჩ	Ც	Ძ	Წ	Ჭ	Ხ	Ჯ
U+1CBx	Ჰ	Ჱ	Ჲ	Ჳ	Ჴ	Ჵ	Ჶ	Ჷ	Ჸ	Ჹ	Ჺ			Ჽ	Ჾ	Ჿ
Notes 1.As of Unicode version 18.0 2.Grey areas indicate non-assigned code points

=== Non-Unicode encodings ===
Mac OS Georgian is a character encoding created by Michael Everson for Georgian on classic Mac OS. It is an extended ASCII encoding, using the 128 code points from 0x80 through 0xFF to represent the characters of the Asomtavruli and Mkhedruli scripts plus a number of widely used symbols not included in 7-bit ASCII.

=== Keyboard layouts ===
Below is the standard Georgian-language keyboard layout, the traditional layout of manual typewriters.

“ „	1 !	2 ?	3 №	4 §	5 %	6 :	7.	8;	9,	0 /	- _	+ =	←^{Backspace}

_{Tab key}	ღ	ჯ	უ	კ	ე ჱ	ნ	გ	შ	წ	ზ	ხ ჴ	ც	) (

_{Caps lock}	ფ ჶ	ძ	ვ ჳ	თ	ა	პ	რ	ო	ლ	დ	ჟ	_{Enter key} ↵

_{Shift key} ↑	ჭ	ჩ	ყ	ს	მ	ი ჲ	ტ	ქ	ბ	ჰ ჵ	_{Shift key} ↑

_{Control key}	_{Win key}	_{Alt key}	_{Space bar}	_{AltGr key}	_{Win key}	_{Menu key}	_{Control key}

== Gallery of the Script Examples ==
Gallery of Asomtavruli, Nuskhuri and Mkhedruli scripts.

=== Asomtavruli Script Examples ===
==== Asomtavruli Inscriptions ====
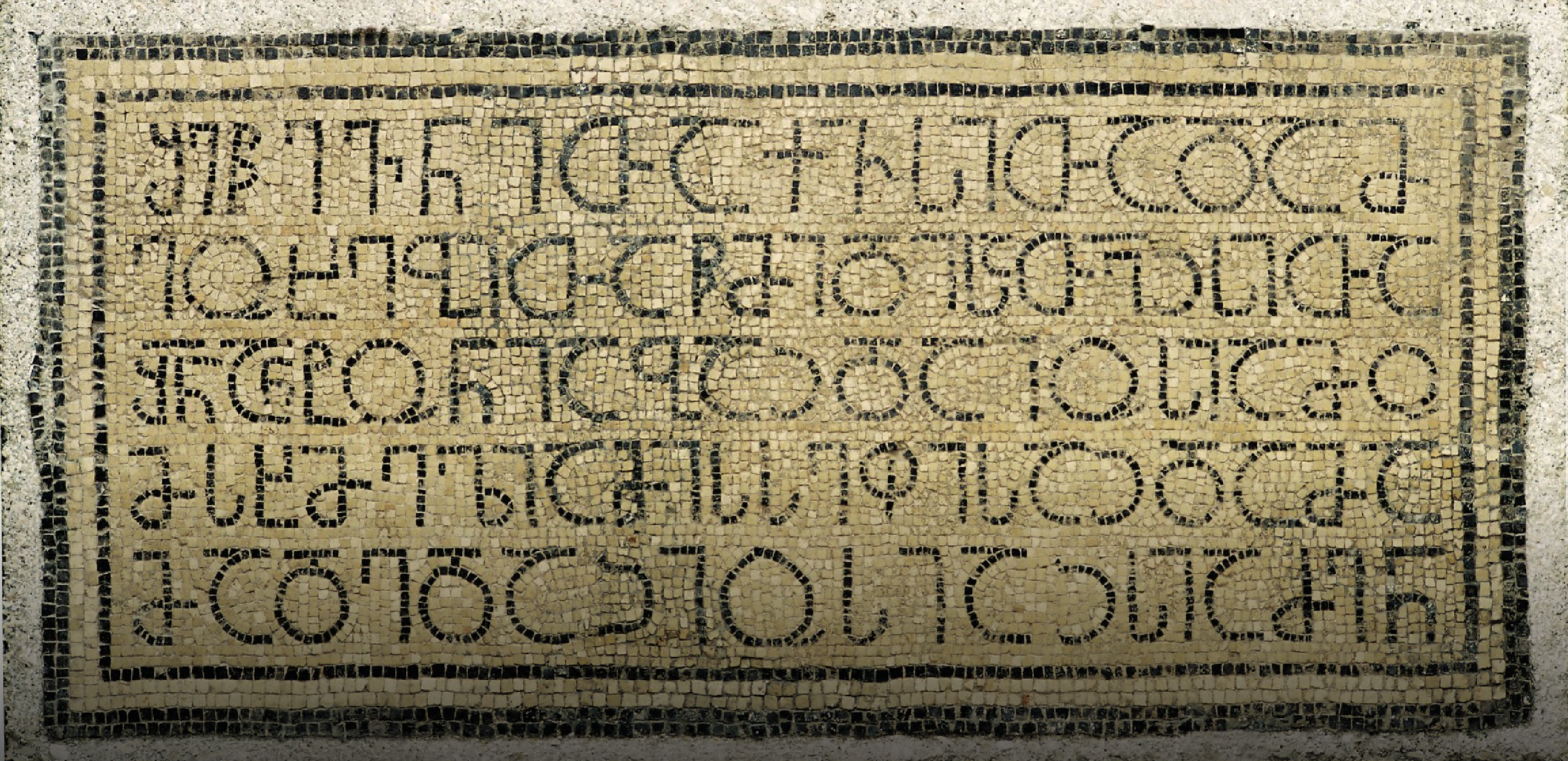
Bir el Qutt inscriptions, ca. AD 430.

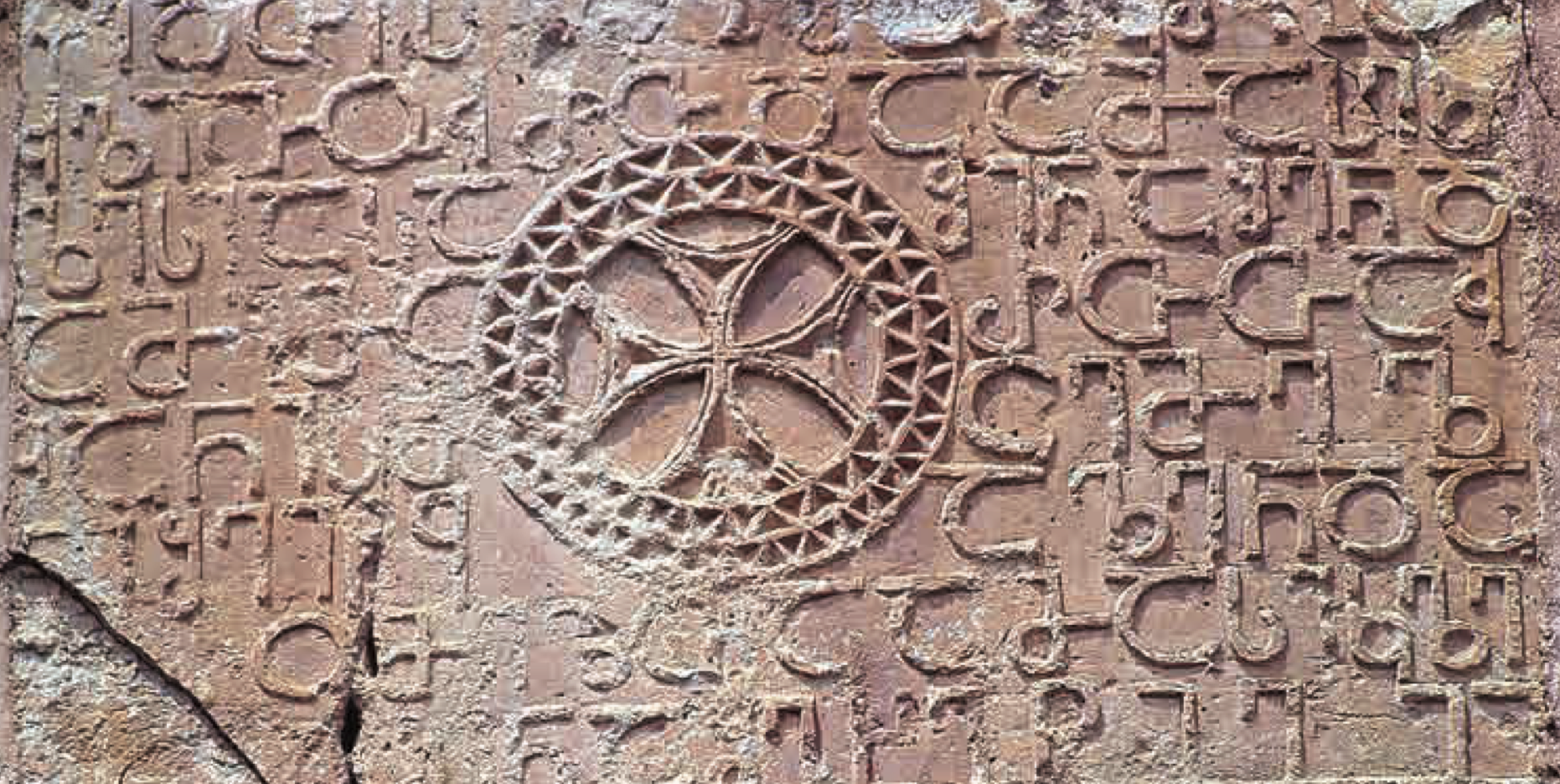
Bas-relief from Bolnisi Sioni Cathedral, AD 493/494+

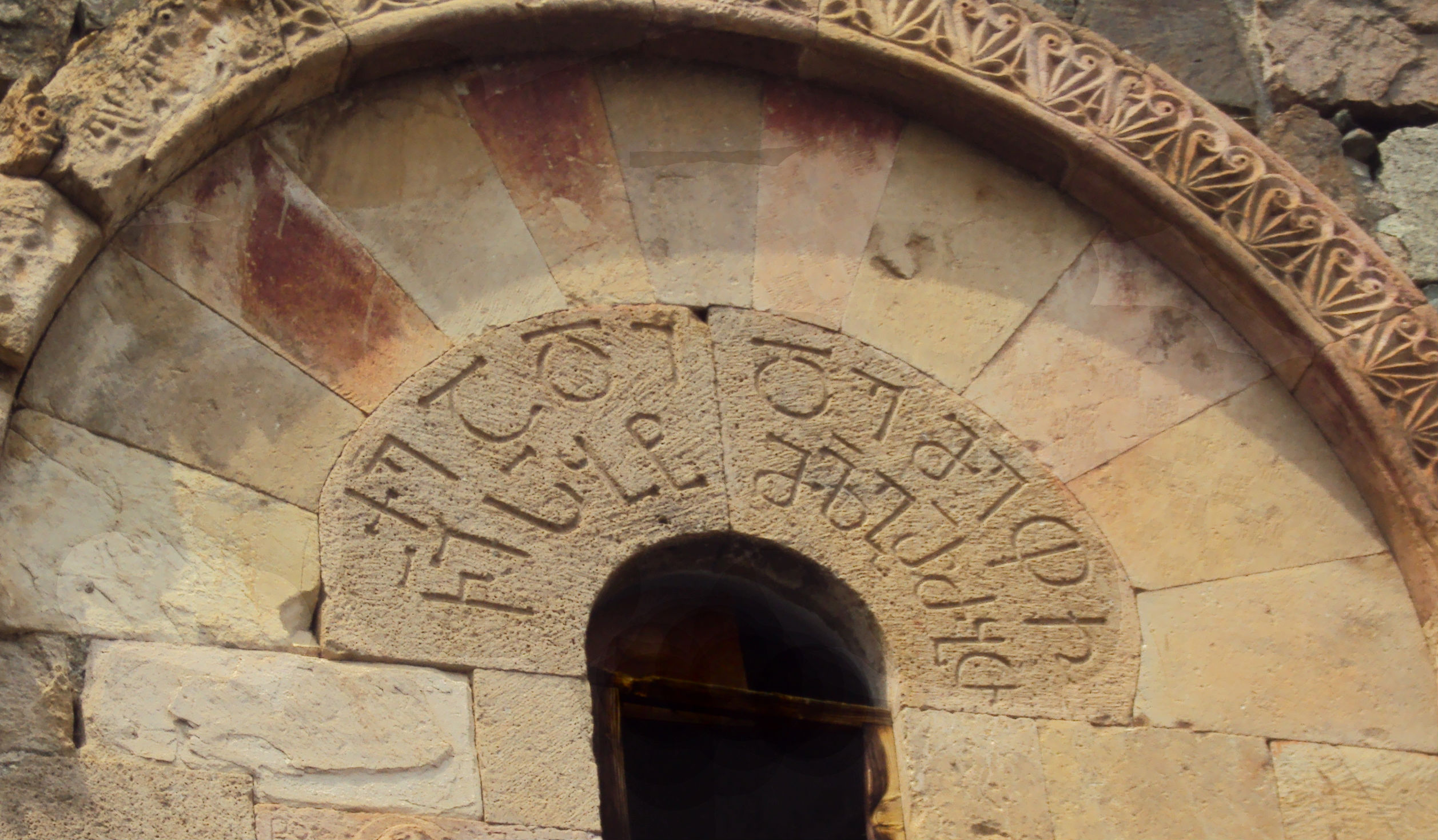
Doliskana inscriptions, 10th century

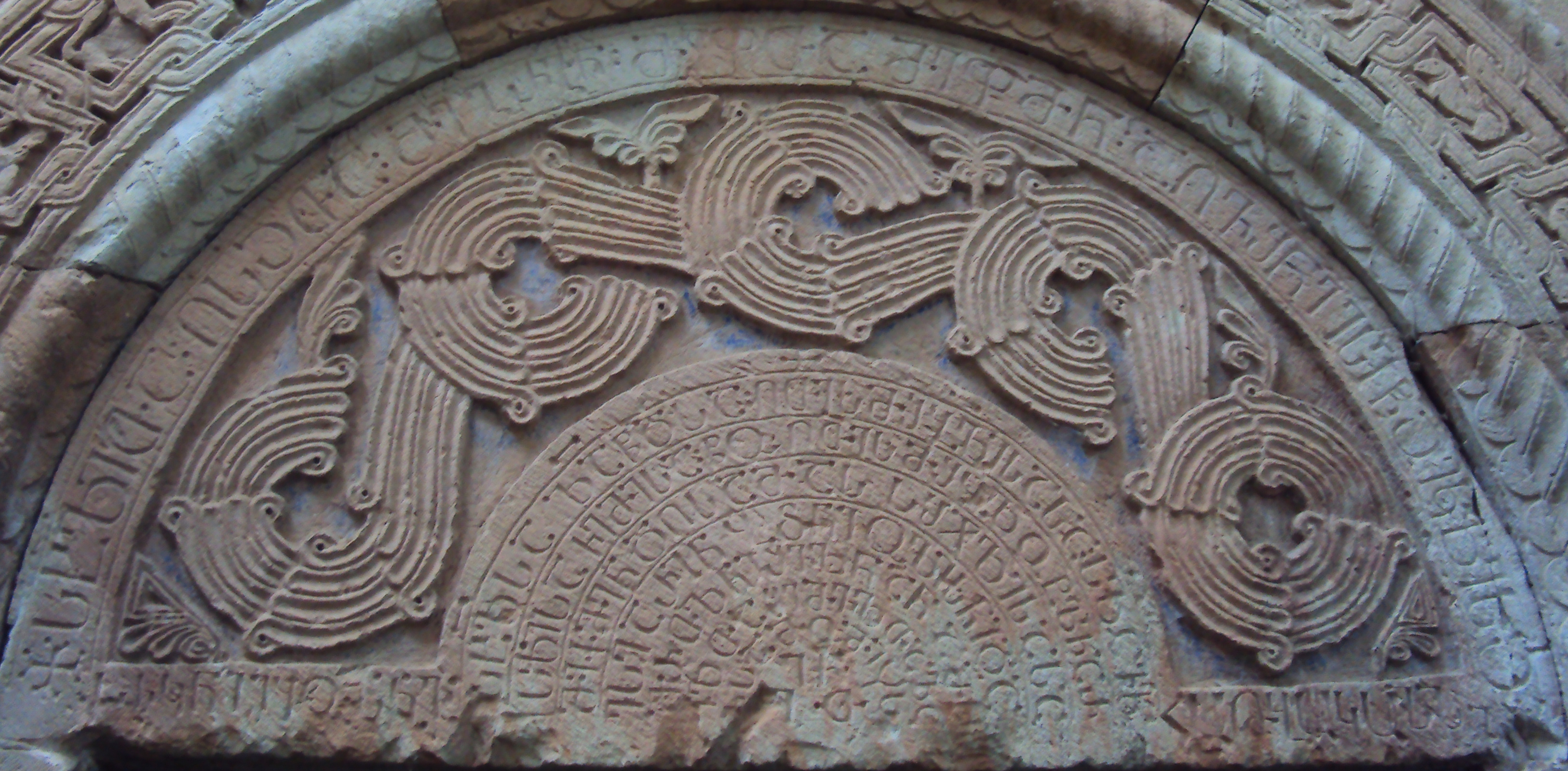
Ishkhani Church, 1006

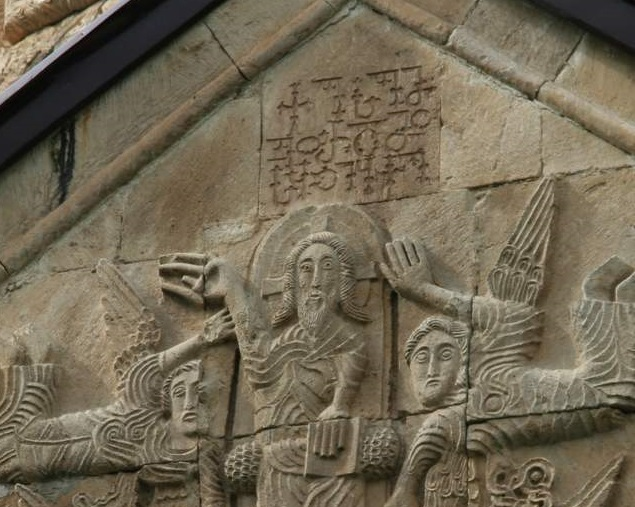
Nikortsminda Cathedral Church Inscriptions

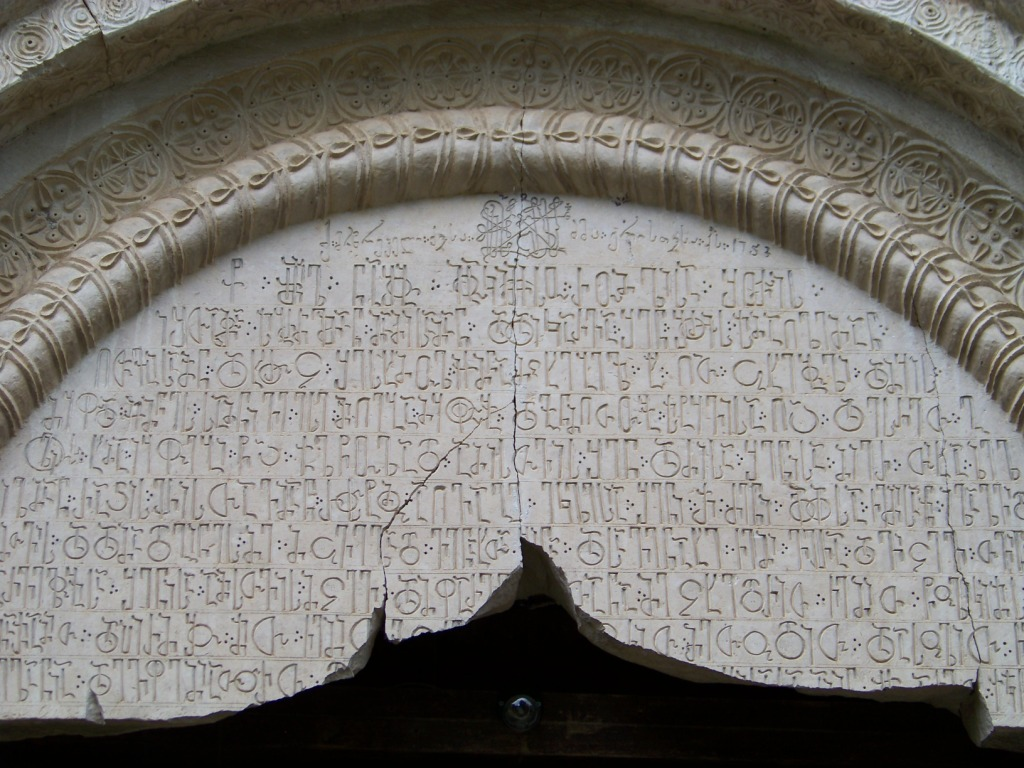
Barakoni Church Inscriptions

==== Asomtavruli Manuscripts ====
Georgian palimpsest, NCM, A-844. Lower-layer Gospel text radiocarbon-dated to the 7th c. Upper layer Gospel Lectionary dateable to 11th cent.

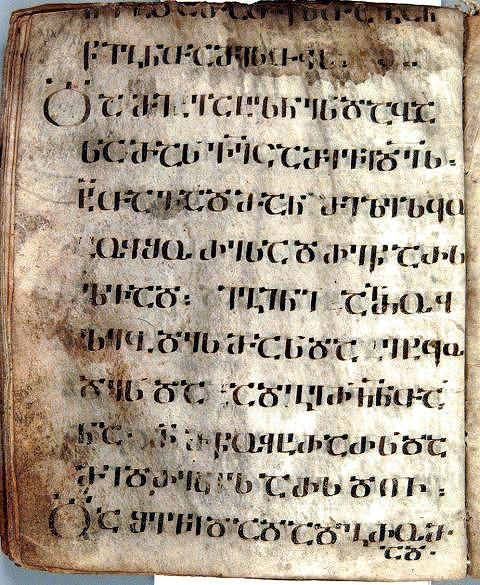
Khanmeti Lectionary, Graz, UBG, MS 2058/1, radiocarbon-dated to the 5th-6th cc.

=== Nuskhuri Script Examples ===
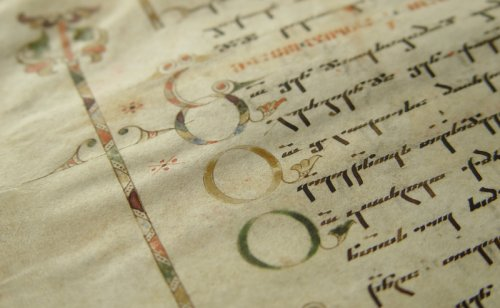
Mikael Modrekili Iadgari (Hymn Book), 10th century

Manuscript Scroll comprising the text of the Liturgy of John Chrysostom, Graz, UBG, MS 2058/5, 11th-12th centuries

Minor Nomocanon, NCM, S-143, 11th century

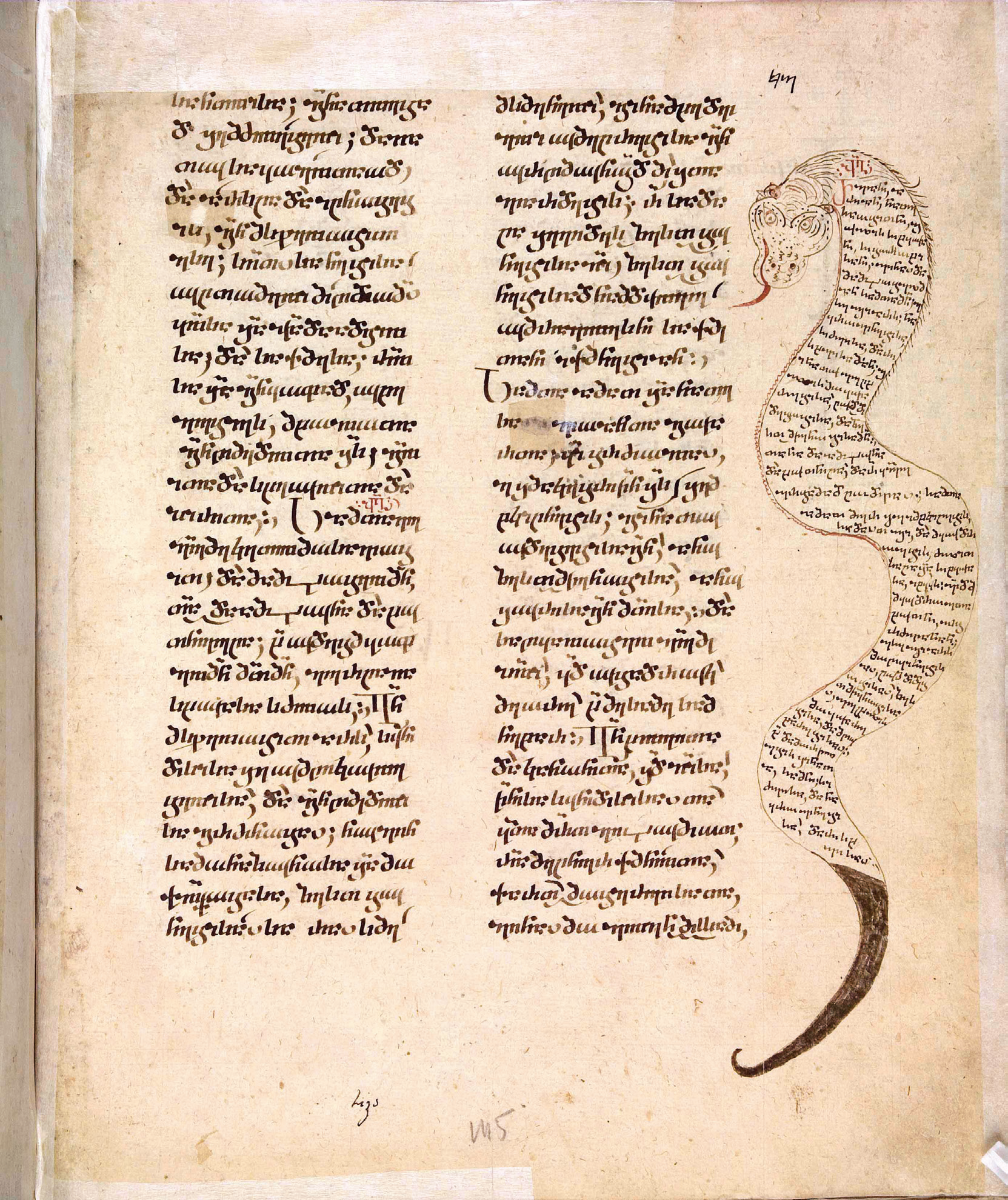
John Climacus, The Ladder of Divine Ascent, copied by Nikrai, 1160

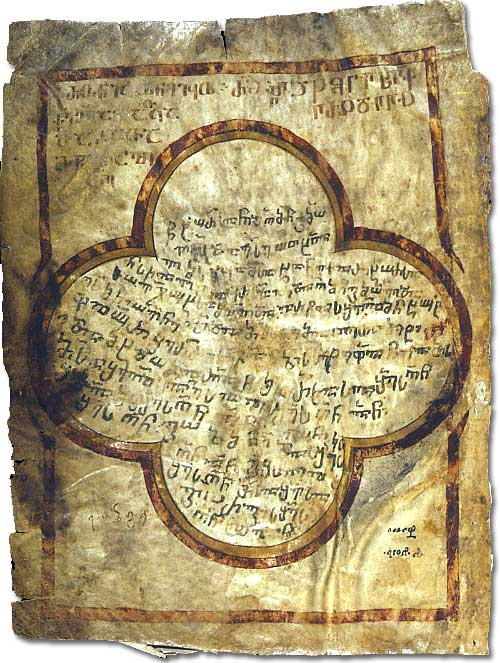
Jruchi Gospels, 13th century

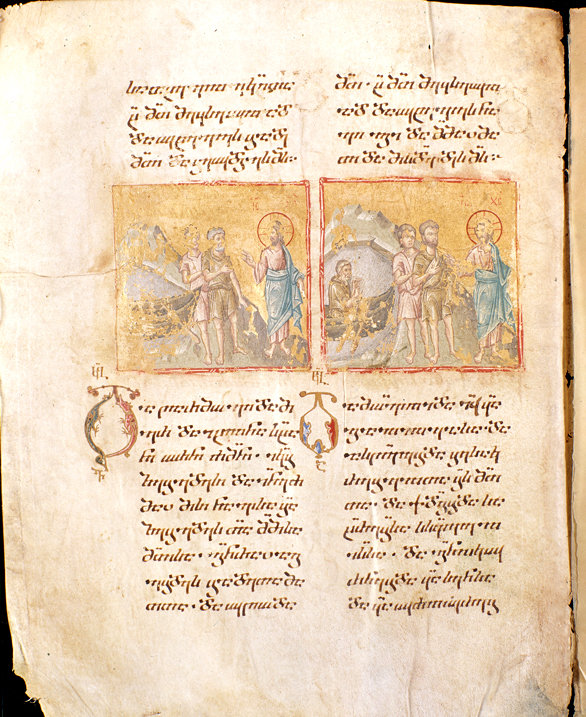
Mokvi Gospel, NCA, Q-902, 1300

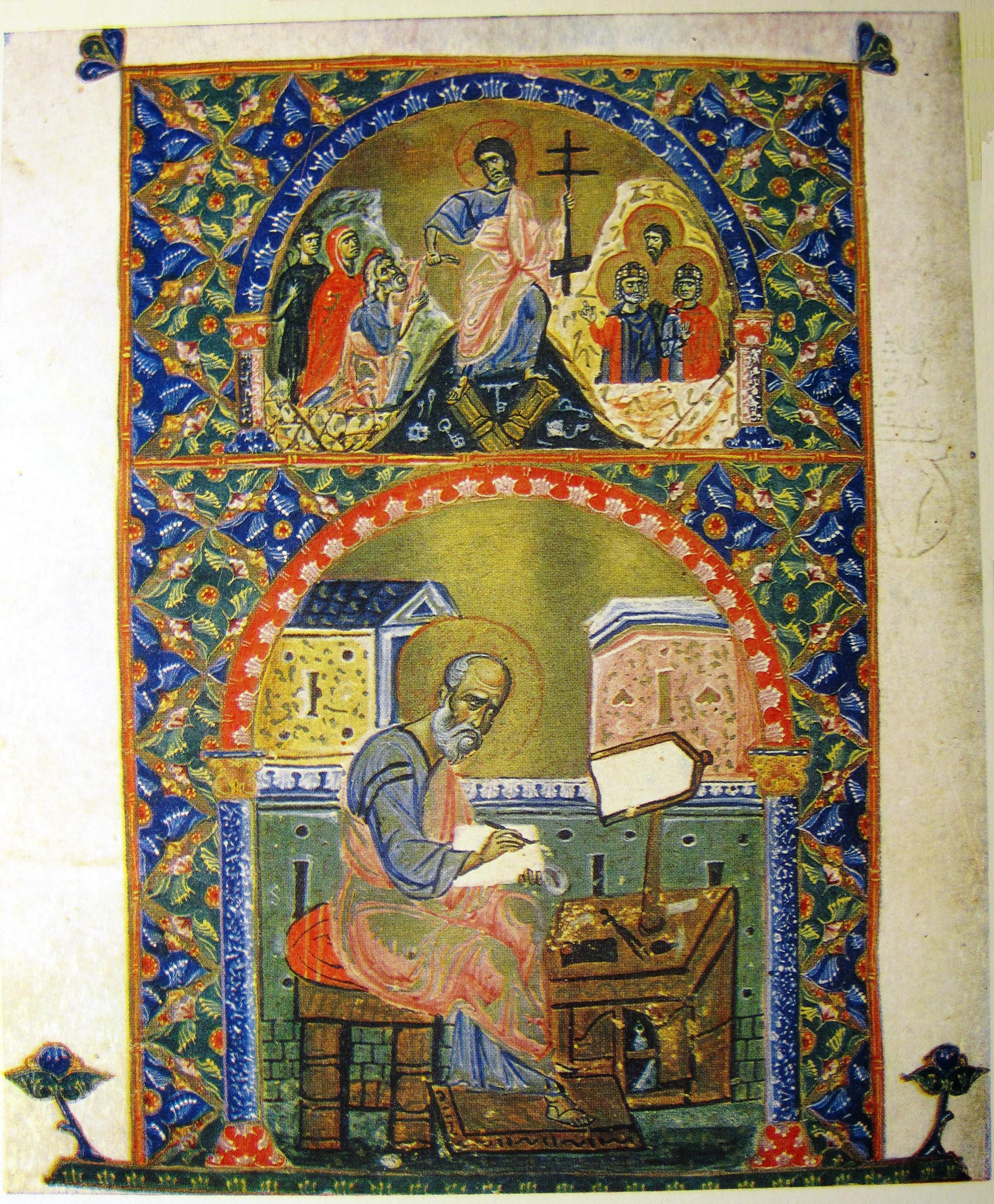
Vani Four Gospels, NCA, A-1335; 12th-13th cc.

=== Mkhedruli Script Examples ===
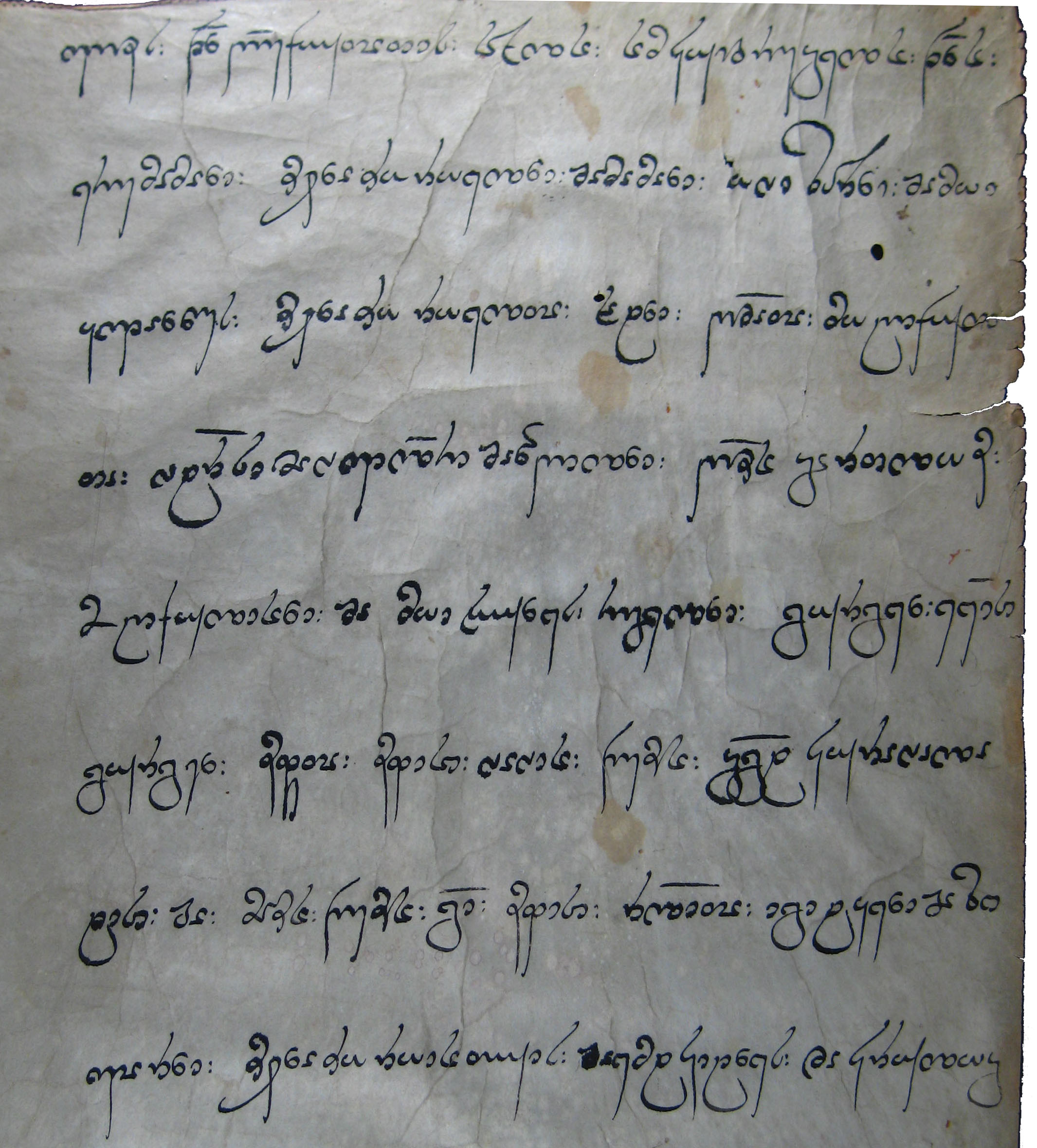
Royal charter of King Bagrat IV of Georgia

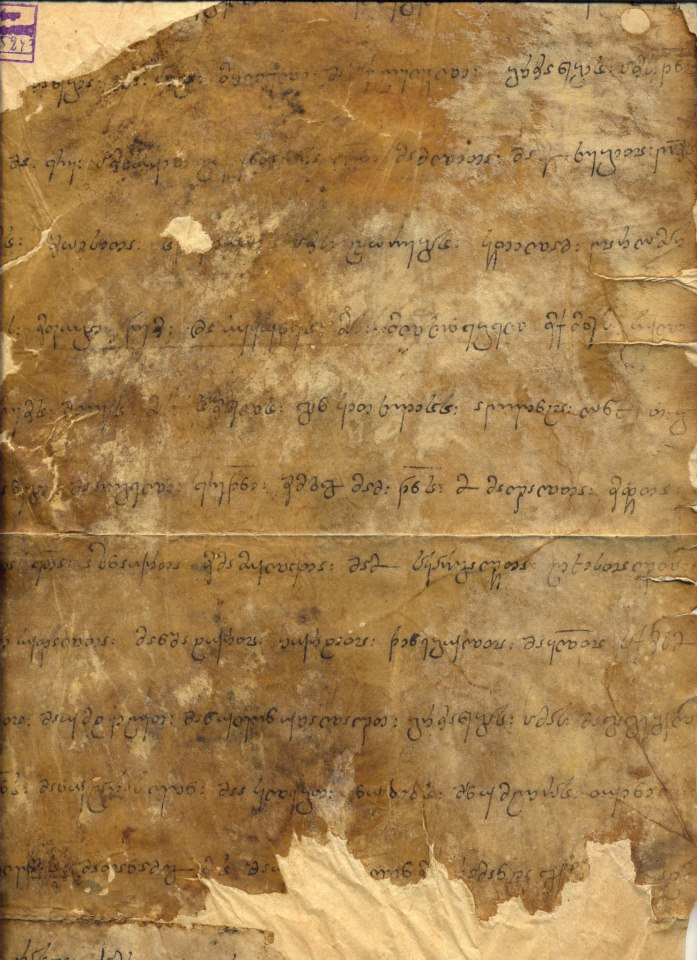
Royal charter of King George II of Georgia

Royal charter of King David IV of Georgia

Royal charter of King George III of Georgia

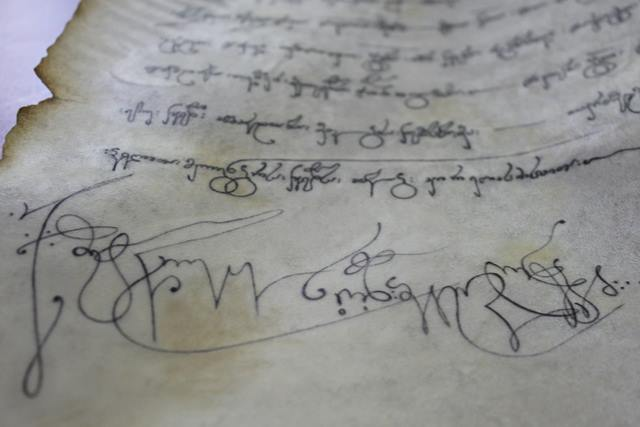
Royal charter of Queen Tamar of Georgia

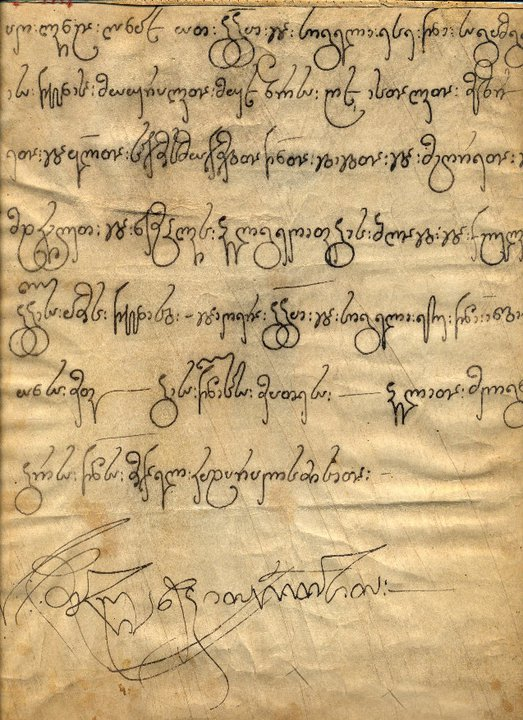
Royal charter of King George IV of Georgia

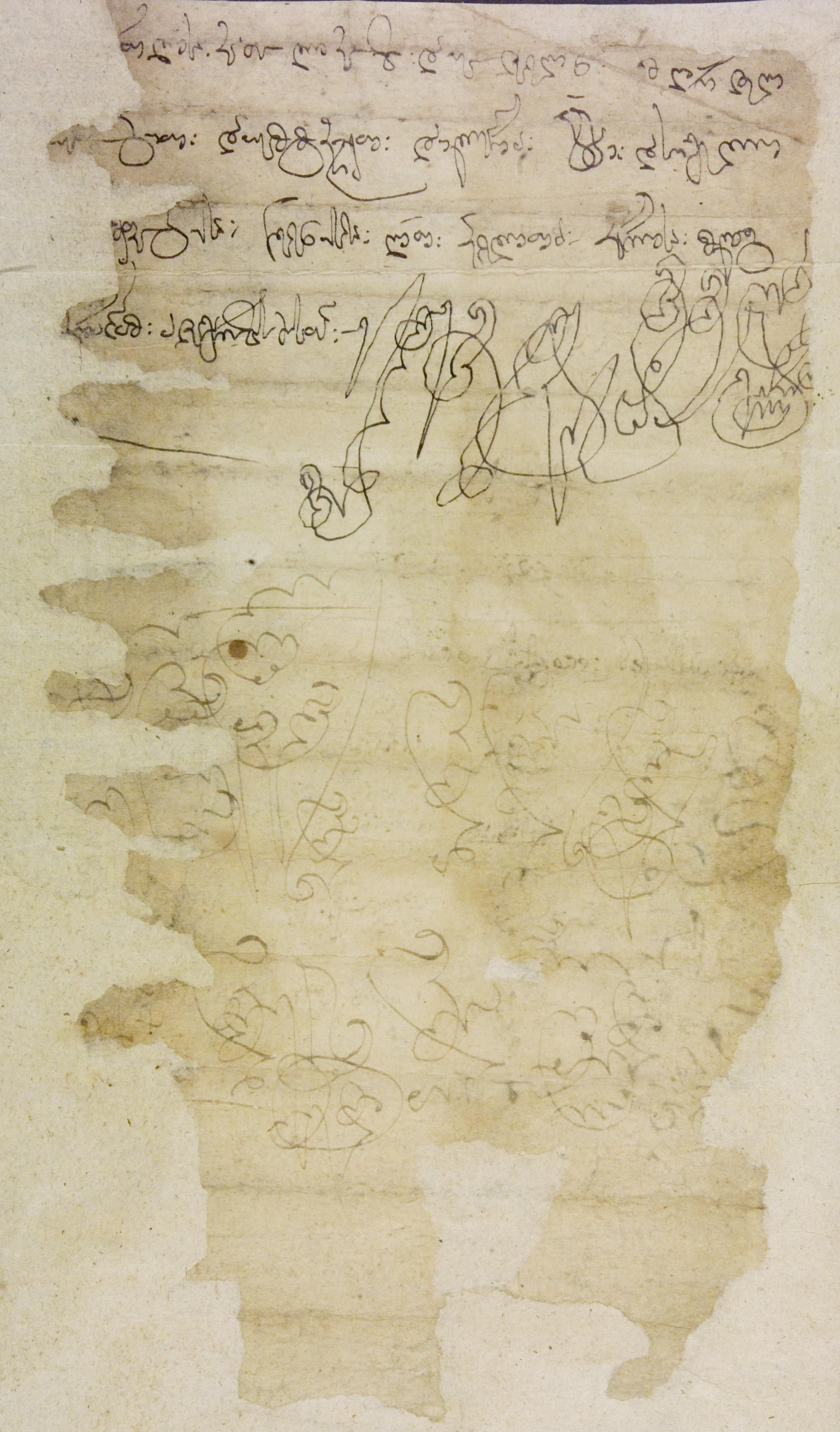
Royal charter of King George V of Georgia

== See also ==
- Armazic language
- Bashplemi lake tablet

== Sources ==
- Aronson, Howard Isaac (1990). Georgian: A Reading Grammar. Columbus, OH: Slavica Publishers. ISBN 978-0-89357-207-5.
- Bowersock, Glen Warren; Brown, Peter; Grabar, Oleg (1999). Late Antiquity: A Guide to the Postclassical World. Harvard University Press. ISBN 978-0-674-51173-6.
- Daniels, Peter T. (1996). The World's Writing Systems. Oxford University Press. ISBN 978-0-19-507993-7.
- Enwall, Joakim (2010). "Turkish texts in Georgian script: Sociolinguistic and ethno-linguistic aspects". In Boeschoten, Hendrik; Rentzsch, Julian (eds.). Turcology in Mainz. Otto Harrassowitz Verlag. ISBN 978-3-447-06113-1.
- George, Julie A. (2009). The Politics of Ethnic Separatism in Russia and Georgia. Palgrave Macmillan US. ISBN 978-0-230-10232-3.
- Gillam, Richard (2003). Unicode Demystified: A Practical Programmer's Guide to the Encoding Standard. Addison-Wesley Professional. ISBN 978-0-201-70052-7.
- Greppin, John A.C. (1981). "Some comments on the origin of the Georgian alphabet". Bazmavēp (139): 449–456.
- Gugushvili, A. (1937). Allen, William Edward David; Gugushvili, A. (eds.). "The Georgian Alphabet". Georgica: A Journal of Georgian and Caucasian Studies (4–5): 324–331.
- Haarmann, Harald (2012). "Ethnic Conflict and standardisation in the Caucasus". In Matthias Hüning; Ulrike Vogl; Olivier Moliner (eds.). Standard Languages and Multilingualism in European History. John Benjamins Publishing. p. 299. ISBN 978-90-272-0055-6.
- Hewitt, B. G. (1995). Georgian: A Structural Reference Grammar. John Benjamins Publishing. ISBN 978-90-272-3802-3.
- Hüning, Matthias; Vogl, Ulrike; Moliner, Olivier (2012). Standard Languages and Multilingualism in European History. John Benjamins Publishing. ISBN 978-90-272-0055-6.
- Katzner, Kenneth; Miller, Kirk (2002). The Languages of the World. Routledge. ISBN 978-1-134-53288-9.
- Kemertelidze, Nino (1999). "The Origin of Kartuli (Georgian) Writing (Alphabet)". In David Cram; Andrew R. Linn; Elke Nowak (eds.). History of Linguistics 1996. Vol. 1: Traditions in Linguistics Worldwide. John Benjamins Publishing Company. ISBN 978-90-272-8382-5.
- Machavariani, Elene (2012). Georgian manuscripts: Issues of script and decoration. Tbilisi: National Academy of Sciences of Georgia Press. ISBN 978-99940-34-46-8.
- Mchedlidze, Tamaz (2013). The restored Georgian alphabet. Vol. I. Fulda, Germany: Fulda.
- Morfill, W. R. (1901). "Georgia". Chambers's encyclopaedia; a dictionary of universal knowledge. Vol. 5 (New ed.). London: W. & R. Chambers. pp. 164–166.
- Nakanishi, Akira (1990). Writing Systems of the World. Tuttle Publishing. ISBN 978-0-8048-1654-0.
- Paolini, Stefano; Cholokashvili, Nikoloz (1629). Dittionario giorgiano e italiano. Rome: Palazzo di Propaganda Fide.
- Rapp, Stephen H. (2003). Studies in medieval Georgian historiography: early texts and Eurasian contexts. Peeters Publishers. ISBN 978-90-429-1318-9.
- Rapp, Stephen H. (2006). "Recovering the Pre-National Caucasian Landscape". In Büttner, Ruth; Peltz, Judith (eds.). Mythical Landscapes then and Now: The Mystification. Antares. pp. 13–52. ISBN 99941-57-34-5.
- Rapp, Stephen H. (2010). "Georgian Christianity". In Parry, Ken (ed.). The Blackwell Companion to Eastern Christianity. John Wiley & Sons. ISBN 978-1-4443-3361-9.
- Rayfield, Donald (2013). The Literature of Georgia: A History. RoutledgeCurzon. ISBN 978-0-7007-1163-5.
- Shanidze, Mzekala (2000). "Greek influence in Georgian linguistics". In Sylvain Auroux (ed.). History of the Language Sciences / Geschichte der Sprachwissenschaften / Histoire des sciences du language. Walter de Gruyter. ISBN 978-3-11-019400-5.
- Shanidze, Akaki (2003). ქართული ენა [The Georgian Language] (in Georgian). Tbilisi. ISBN 978-1-4020-1440-6.
- Shanidze, Akaki (1973). The Basics of the Georgian language grammar. Tbilisi.
- Thomson, Robert W. (1996). Rewriting Caucasian History: The Medieval Armenian Adaptation of the Georgian Chronicles : the Original Georgian Texts and the Armenian Adaptation. Clarendon Press. ISBN 978-0-19-826373-9.
- West, Barbara A. (2010). Encyclopedia of the Peoples of Asia and Oceania. Infobase Publishing. ISBN 978-1-4381-1913-7.
