= Georgian keyboard =

Keyboard layouts used for the Georgian scripts

The Georgian keyboard (Georgian: ქართული კლავიატურა, romanized: kartuli k'laviat'ura) includes several keyboard layouts for the Georgian script.

== QWERTY keyboard ==
The Georgian QWERTY keyboard layout has the Georgian letters placed similarly to the corresponding Latin letters. While Georgian has no capital letters, because it has 33 letters and English has only 26, using the shift key is necessary to write Georgian, because several letters require shifting in order to be typed. QWERTY is the most popular keyboard layout for writing Georgian.

“ „	! 1	@ 2 „	# 3 “	$ 4	% 5 €	6	& 7	* 8 °	( 9	) 0	_: —	+ = –	←^{Backspace}

_{Tab key}	ქ	ჭ წ	ე ჱ	ღ რ ®	თ ტ	ყ ჸ	უ	ი ჲ	ო	პ	{ [	} ]	| ~

_{Caps lock}	ა ჺ	შ ს	დ	ფ ჶ	გ ჹ	ჰ ჵ	ჟ ჯ ჷ	კ	ლ ₾	:;	" '	_{Enter key} ↵

_{Shift key} ↑	ძ ზ	ხ ჴ	ჩ ც ©	ვ ჳ	ბ	ნ ჼ	მ	<, «	>. »	? / ჻	_{Shift key} ↑

_{Control key}	_{Win key}	_{Alt key}	_{Space bar}	_{AltGr key}	_{Win key}	_{Menu key}	_{Control key}

== Standard keyboard ==
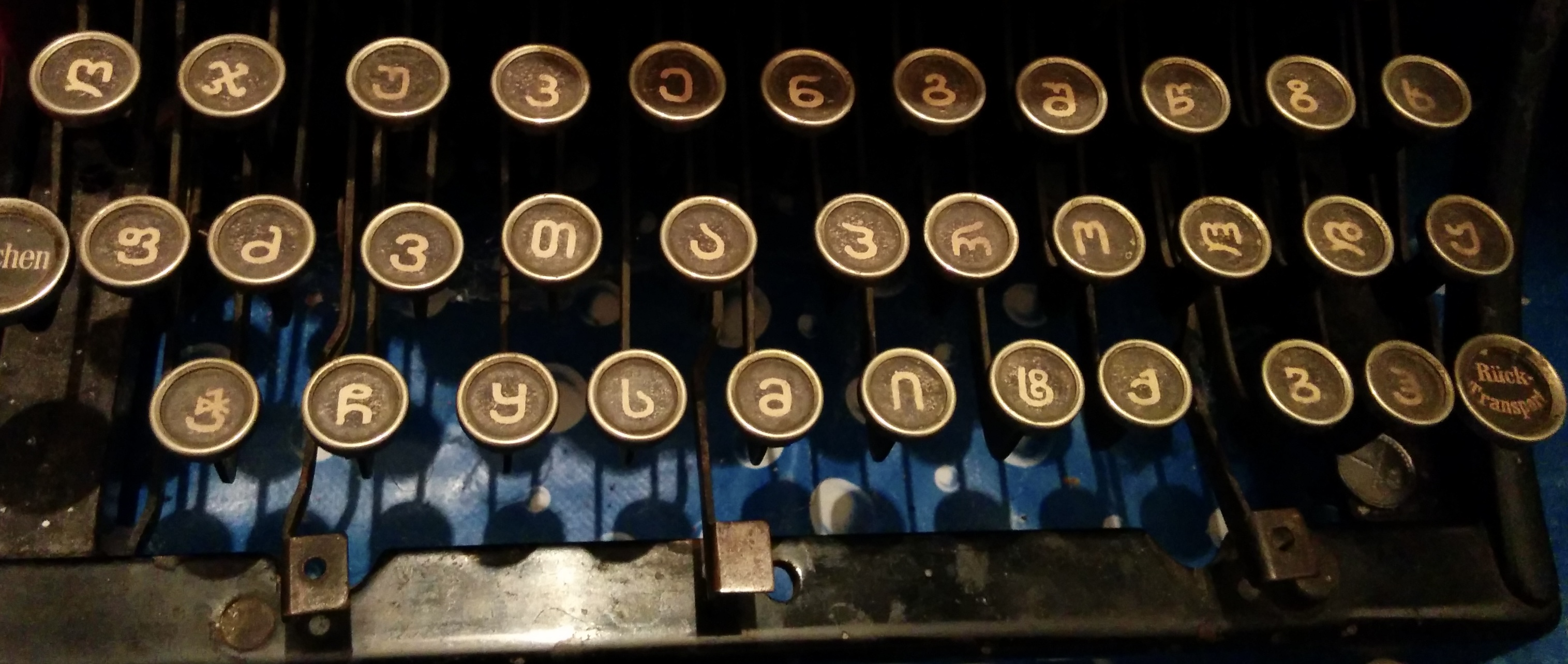
Georgian typewriter based on JCUKEN.

The Georgian standard keyboard layout was essentially that of manual typewriters. It is mostly a phonetic transliteration of the Russian JCUKEN keyboard layout, with some characters on rows two and three shifted right to accommodate additional Georgian letters, others replaced with dissimilar Georgian letters and differences in the non-letter keys, including inverted functionality of the shift key in most of the top row.

“ „	1 !	2 ?	3 №	4 §	5 %	6 :	7.	8;	9,	0 /	- _	+ =	←^{Backspace}

_{Tab key}	ღ	ჯ	უ	კ	ე ჱ	ნ	გ	შ	წ	ზ	ხ ჴ	ც	) (

_{Caps lock}	ფ ჶ	ძ	ვ ჳ	თ	ა	პ	რ	ო	ლ	დ	ჟ	_{Enter key} ↵

_{Shift key} ↑	ჭ	ჩ	ყ	ს	მ	ი ჲ	ტ	ქ	ბ	ჰ ჵ	_{Shift key} ↑

_{Control key}	_{Win key}	_{Alt key}	_{Space bar}	_{AltGr key}	_{Win key}	_{Menu key}	_{Control key}

== Other keyboards ==
There is also a Georgian ergonomic keyboard layout.
