= Gugushvili =

Gugushvili (Georgian: გუგუშვილი) is a Georgian surname that may refer to the following notable people:

- Besarion Gugushvili (born 1945), Georgian and Chechen politician
- Elguja Gugushvili (born 1946), Georgian football manager and former player
- Evdokia Kozhevnikova-Gugushvili (1905–1975), Soviet ethnographer
- Gia Gugushvili (born 1952), Georgian painter
