= Vie (letter) =

22nd letter of the three Georgian scripts

- Ⴣ ⴣ ჳ Ჳ

Usage
- Writing system: Georgian script
- Type: Alphabetic
- Language of origin: Georgian language Svan language
- Sound values: [wi], [w]
- In Unicode: U+10C3, U+2D23, U+10F3, U+1CB3
- Alphabetical position: 22

History
- Time period: c. 430 to present
- Transliterations: W, Ü, Wi

Other
- Associated numbers: 400
- Writing direction: Left-to-right

Vie, or We (Asomtavruli: Ⴣ; Nuskhuri: ⴣ; Mkhedruli: ჳ; Mtavruli: Ჳ; Georgian: ჳე, ვიე) is the 22nd letter of the three Georgian scripts.

In the system of Georgian numerals, it has a value of 400. In the Georgian language, it represented the diphthong /wi/. It is now obsolete in the Georgian language, due to it gradually being pronounced as the digraph ვი (vi) overtime. Currently, this letter is still used in the Svan language, representing the voiced labial-velar approximant /w/. It is typically romanized with the letters W, and Ü, or with the digraph Wi.

== Letter ==
asomtavruli	nuskhuri	mkhedruli	mtavruli

=== Three-dimensional ===
asomtavruli

nuskhuri

mkhedruli

=== Stroke order ===
asomtavruli

== Computer encodings ==
Character information
Preview	Ⴣ		ⴣ		ჳ		Ჳ	
Unicode name	GEORGIAN CAPITAL LETTER WE		GEORGIAN SMALL LETTER WE		GEORGIAN LETTER WE		GEORGIAN MTAVRULI CAPITAL LETTER WE	
Encodings	decimal	hex	dec	hex	dec	hex	dec	hex
Unicode	4291	U+10C3	11555	U+2D23	4339	U+10F3	7347	U+1CB3
UTF-8	225 131 131	E1 83 83	226 180 163	E2 B4 A3	225 131 179	E1 83 B3	225 178 179	E1 B2 B3
Numeric character reference	&#4291;	&#x10C3;	&#11555;	&#x2D23;	&#4339;	&#x10F3;	&#7347;	&#x1CB3;

== See also ==
- Latin letter W
- Georgian letter Vini

== Bibliography ==
- Mchedlidze, T. (1) The restored Georgian alphabet, Fulda, Germany, 2013
- Mchedlidze, T. (2) The Georgian script; Dictionary and guide, Fulda, Germany, 2013
- Machavariani, E. Georgian manuscripts, Tbilisi, 2011
- The Unicode Standard, Version 6.3, (1) Georgian, 1991-2013
- The Unicode Standard, Version 6.3, (2) Georgian Supplement, 1991-2013
