= He (Georgian letter) =

8th letter of the three Georgian scripts

- Ⴡ ⴡ ჱ Ჱ

Usage
- Writing system: Georgian script
- Type: Alphabetic
- Language of origin: Georgian language Svan language
- Sound values: [e̞j], [eː]
- In Unicode: U+10C1, U+2D21, U+10F1, U+1CB1
- Alphabetical position: 8

History
- Time period: c. 430 to present
- Transliterations: Ē, Ey

Other
- Associated numbers: 8
- Writing direction: Left-to-right

He, Ei, or E-merve (Note: lit. eighth e.) (Asomtavruli: Ⴡ; Nuskhuri: ⴡ; Mkhedruli: ჱ; Mtavruli: Ჱ; Georgian: ეჲ, ეი, ე-მერვე) is the 8th letter of the three Georgian scripts. In the Georgian language, it represented the diphthong /e̞j/. Currently, it is only used in the Svan language, where it is used for /eː/.

In the system of Georgian numerals, it has a value of 8. It is now obsolete in the Georgian language, replaced by ეჲ (ei) due to its identical pronunciation. It is typically romanized with the letter E with macron (Ē) or with the digraph Ey.

== Letter ==
asomtavruli	nuskhuri	mkhedruli	mtavruli

=== Three-dimensional ===
asomtavruli

nuskhuri

mkhedruli

=== Stroke order ===
asomtavruli

== Computer encodings ==
Character information
Preview	Ⴡ		ⴡ		ჱ		Ჱ	
Unicode name	GEORGIAN CAPITAL LETTER HE		GEORGIAN SMALL LETTER HE		GEORGIAN LETTER HE		GEORGIAN MTAVRULI CAPITAL LETTER HE	
Encodings	decimal	hex	dec	hex	dec	hex	dec	hex
Unicode	4289	U+10C1	11553	U+2D21	4337	U+10F1	7345	U+1CB1
UTF-8	225 131 129	E1 83 81	226 180 161	E2 B4 A1	225 131 177	E1 83 B1	225 178 177	E1 B2 B1
Numeric character reference	&#4289;	&#x10C1;	&#11553;	&#x2D21;	&#4337;	&#x10F1;	&#7345;	&#x1CB1;

== See also ==
- He (letter)
- Eni (letter)
- Greek letter Eta

== Bibliography ==
- Mchedlidze, T. (1) The restored Georgian alphabet, Fulda, Germany, 2013
- Mchedlidze, T. (2) The Georgian script; Dictionary and guide, Fulda, Germany, 2013
- Machavariani, E. Georgian manuscripts, Tbilisi, 2011
- The Unicode Standard, Version 6.3, (1) Georgian, 1991-2013
- The Unicode Standard, Version 6.3, (2) Georgian Supplement, 1991-2013
