= Explanatory dictionary of the Georgian language =

Eight volume dictionary of the Georgian language produced 1950-64

- Editor: Arnold Chikobava
- Original title: ქართული ენის განმარტებითი ლექსიკონი
- Publication date: 1950

The Explanatory Dictionary of the Georgian Language (Georgian: ქართული ენის განმარტებითი ლექსიკონი) is one of the major explanatory dictionaries of the Georgian language. It consists of eight volumes and contains nearly 115,000 words. The editor in chief was Arnold Chikobava. It was produced from 1950 until 1964, and about 150 scientists worked on it. It was the first Georgian dictionary which had a systematic documentation for each word. The words are arranged alphabetically. The first volume contains a brief description of the grammar of Georgian.

== See also ==
- Georgian language
