= Evdokia Kozhevnikova =

Soviet ethnographer (1905–1975)

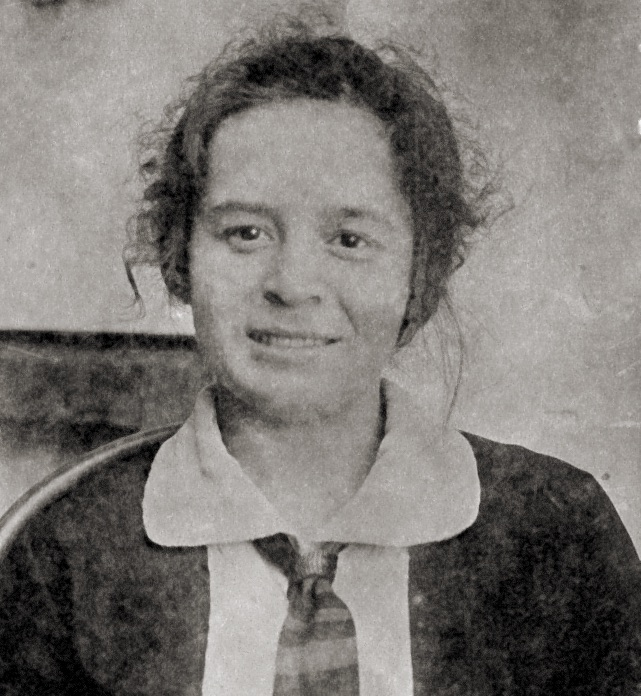
- Self-portrait, year unknown
- Born: 28 December 1905; Blagoveshchensk, Amur Oblast, Russian Empire
- Died: 1975 (aged 69–70)
- Education: Geographical Institute of the Russian Soviet Federative Socialist Republic
- Occupation: Ethnographer

Evdokia Kozhevnikova-Gugushvili (Georgian: ევდოკია კოჟევნიკოვა-გუგუშვილი; Russian: Евдокия Иннокентьевна Коже́вникова-Гугушвили, romanized: Yevdokiya Innokent'yevna Kozhevnikova-Gugushvili; 28 December 1905 (Note: Some documents give a birth year of 1904) – 1975) was a Soviet ethnographer who did extensive fieldwork in the province of Svaneti in the Republic of Georgia. During the course of her fieldwork, she acquired considerable fluency in Svan, and produced some 1200 handwritten pages in the language between 1927 and 1936. She never completed her dissertation, and her unpublished work remained almost entirely unknown to the academic world until her records were rediscovered in the 2010s. Since then, researchers at the Georgian National Museum as well as some foreign anthropologists have begun to catalog, translate, and analyse several hundred pages from Kozhevnikova's archives. In 2023, the Georgian National Museum published a compilation of papers about Kozhevnikova and her work, entitled Dina Kozhevnikova: Ethnographical Records.

== Early life and education ==
Kozhevnikova was born on 28 December 1905 in Blagoveshchensk, in what was then the Amur Oblast of the Russian Empire. Her parents were Innokenty Yakovlevich Kozhevnikov (Russian: Иннокентий Яковлевич Кожевников), who served the Russian Imperial government as a Manchurian language specialist and envoy, and his wife Elena Leonova Kozhevnikova (Russian: Елена Леонова Кожевникова; née Chekhovich). She was the youngest of four children. After Evdokia's father died in 1908 at the age of 45, her mother moved the family to Saint Petersburg, where Evdokia was enrolled in the Pavlovsky Institute for Girls of the Nobility (Russian: Павловский институт благородных девиц).

In 1923, Evdokia graduated from St. Leningrad (Petersburg) #33 Labor School, where she also worked as a tutor. In 1924, at the age of 19, Evdokia began studies in ethnography at the Geographical Institute of the Russian Soviet Federative Socialist Republic (RSFSR), subsequently incorporated into Leningrad State University as the Faculty of Geography and Geoecology, Saint Petersburg State University. Among her teachers were the ethnologist Vladimir Bogoraz, the historian and philologist Evgeny Kagarov, and the linguist Nikolai Marr, who was at that time one of the most influential figures in Soviet academia.

== Fieldwork ==
In 1926, Kozhevnikova briefly visited the northern Georgian province of Racha. At the behest of Marr, who was a leading specialist on the languages of the Caucasus, Kozhevnikova undertook three summer field trips to the province of Svaneti in the Republic of Georgia from 1927 to 1929. The first trip, undertaken with classmate Zoia Polozhenskaia, lasted for two months. It was a difficult endeavour overall: their funding was limited, overland travel was rough, and the students lacked fluency in the unwritten Svan language and had to rely on translation provided by the small number of locals who could speak Russian.

Her funding remained limited and she supplemented her income with various side jobs. In 1928, Kozhevnikova wrote to the Scientific Council of Leningrad University stressing the importance of ethnological research on Svan culture and traditions, and requesting funding for additional fieldwork. By this time, she had acquired some amount of Svan, and had made friends with the villagers, who nicknamed her "Dina" (meaning "girl" in Svan). She adopted the name, signing much of her writing from this time as Dina Kozhevnikova. Her trip that year ended early after she came down with a severe typhus infection and had to be carried on a stretcher over a distance of 100 km (60 mi) to receive medical treatment.

Kozhevnikova graduated in 1930, and a few months later began what was to be her longest expedition in Svaneti, spending 15 months in the communes of Ipari, Latali, Mulakhi and Becho, from September 1930 to December 1931. During her fieldwork, she acquired considerable fluency in Svan, and produced some 1200 handwritten pages in the language between 1927 and 1936.

Desire

Oh, if only my dream could stride like Merani! (Note: A winged horse from Georgian mythology)
His inspired winged flight,
With its aspiration in a single desire,
With one call, "forward and forward!"
I would, as a young girl, gišris tmiani, (Note: A girl in Georgian mythology who rides the rainbow)
Cut a starry path on the rainbow,
I'd catch up to you, my black Merani,
To look forward to the ages together
with my dream.

— Evdokia "Dina" Kozhevnikova, unpublished poem, dated 1968

In 1933, under Marr's tutelage, Dina Kozhevnikova continued her studies at Leningrad State University for a time. From 1932 to 1934, she was employed as a field researcher in Svaneti by the Institute of Language and Material Culture at the Russian Academy of Sciences. In 1933, Kozhevnikova married the Georgian jurist Ivane (Vano) Gugushvili, and moved to Tbilisi, Georgia, where her children Vladimer (b. 1934) and Elene (b. 1938) were born. Despite sporadic attempts to resume her doctoral studies, Kozhevnikova never finished her dissertation, and failed to obtain permanent employment at the Georgian National Museum. In addition to her ethnographic work, Kozhevnikova wrote poetry, which also went unpublished.

=== Research focus ===
In the course of her fieldwork, Kozhevnikova recorded hundreds of pages of texts in the Svan language, mostly descriptions of the dozens of festivals and feast days from the annual calendar of Svan vernacular Christianity. She also took about two hundred photographs, including images of religious practices which had never been documented before. Kozhevnikova took a particular interest in women's issues, and conflicts between traditional customary law and the newly-imposed Soviet legal code. Researchers consider Kozhevnikova's descriptions of women's secret rituals, which men are not allowed to witness, to be her most significant work. Besides her work on Svan folk religion, Kozhevnikova's field diaries provide a valuable window into daily life in Svaneti in the first decade of Soviet power, during the interval between the uprising of the Svans against the Bolshevik regime in 1921 and the August Uprising in 1924, and the Great Purge of the late 1930s.

== Rediscovery ==
Kozhevnikova's unpublished ethnographic materials from Svaneti remained almost entirely unknown to the academic world until the 2010s, over four decades after her death, when a 2017 exhibition of some of her photographs took place at the Svaneti Museum in Mestia. Since then, researchers at the Georgian National Museum as well as some foreign anthropologists have begun to catalog, scan, and translate several hundred pages from Kozhevnikova's archives, which have been published to a website maintained by the Georgian National Museum. Besides their importance for the study of Svanetian culture in the early Stalin period, linguistic specialists have noted the phonetic precision of Kozhevnikova's transcriptions, and their significance for the study of the Svan language. In 2023, the Georgian National Museum published a compilation of papers about Kozhevnikova and her work, entitled Dina Kozhevnikova: Ethnographical Records.

== Bibliography ==
- Chant'ladze, Iza; Ioseliani, Rusudan (2018). "Svanetis mivic'q'ebuli mk'vlevari: evdok'ia k'oževnik'ova-gugušvili" [On a forgotten researcher of Svaneti: Evdokia Koževnikova-Gugušvili)]. Iberiul-k'avk'asiuri Enatmecniereba (in Georgian). 46: 1–11.
- Kvantidze, Gulnara; Khizanashvili, Manana, eds. (2023). Dina Kozhevnikova: Ethnographical Records (in Georgian). Tbilisi: Georgian National Museum. ISBN 978-9941-9822-1-7.
  - Khizanashvili, Manana. "Eudokia (Dina) Kozhevnikova-gugushvili - Adopted Daughter of Svaneti". In Kvantidze & Khizanashvili (2023), pp. 12–21.
  - Margiani, Ketevan. "Texts in the Svan Language by Dina Kozhevnikova (Linguistic Analysis)". In Kvantidze & Khizanashvili (2023), pp. 82–91.
  - Tuite, Kevin; Mykolenko, Anastasiia. "Dina Kozhevnikova, an Ethnographer, and Poet, in Soviet Svaneti, 1928-1931". In Kvantidze & Khizanashvili (2023), pp. 93–103.
