= Yn (Georgian letter) =

Additional letter of the Georgian alphabet

- Ⴧ ⴧ ჷ Ჷ

Usage
- Writing system: Georgian script
- Type: Alphabetic
- Language of origin: Svan language Mingrelian language
- Sound values: [ə], [ɯ], [ɨ]
- In Unicode: U+10C7, U+2D27, U+10F7, U+1CB7

History
- Development: Ⴓ ⴓ უ Უ?: Ⴧ ⴧ ჷ Ჷ
- Transliterations: Ə, Ĕ

Other
- Associated numbers: None
- Writing direction: Left-to-right

Yn, or Schwa (Asomtavruli: Ⴧ; Nuskhuri: ⴧ; Mkhedruli: ჷ; Mtavruli: Ჷ; Georgian: ჷნ, შვა; [ə]) is an additional letter of the Georgian script. Currently, this letter is used in the Svan and Mingrelian alphabets, and historically also in Ossetian and Abkhazian when those languages used the Georgian script. It represents the mid central vowel /ə/ in Svan and Mingrelian (sometimes realized as the close back unrounded vowel /ɯ/ or the close central unrounded vowel /ɨ/) and the close central unrounded vowel /ɨ/ in Ossetian. Because this letter is not one of the original Georgian letters, it has no numerical value. It is typically romanized with the letter Schwa (Ə) or the letter E with breve (Ĕ). Some speculations claim that the letter Yn originated from the letter Uni.

== Letter ==
asomtavruli	nuskhuri	mkhedruli	mtavruli

=== Three-dimensional ===
asomtavruli

nuskhuri

mkhedruli

== Computing codes ==
Character information
Preview	Ⴧ		ⴧ		ჷ		Ჷ	
Unicode name	GEORGIAN CAPITAL LETTER YN		GEORGIAN SMALL LETTER YN		GEORGIAN LETTER YN		GEORGIAN MTAVRULI CAPITAL LETTER YN	
Encodings	decimal	hex	dec	hex	dec	hex	dec	hex
Unicode	4295	U+10C7	11559	U+2D27	4343	U+10F7	7351	U+1CB7
UTF-8	225 131 135	E1 83 87	226 180 167	E2 B4 A7	225 131 183	E1 83 B7	225 178 183	E1 B2 B7
Numeric character reference	&#4295;	&#x10C7;	&#11559;	&#x2D27;	&#4343;	&#x10F7;	&#7351;	&#x1CB7;

== See also ==
- Ы (Cyrillic)
- Y (Latin)
- Georgian alphabet
- Svan language
- Mingrelian language
- Ossetian language
- Abkhaz language
