= Pari (letter) =

24th letter of the three Georgian scripts

- Ⴔ ⴔ ფ Ფ

Usage
- Writing system: Georgian script
- Type: Alphabetic
- Language of origin: Georgian language
- Sound values: [p⁽ʰ⁾]
- In Unicode: U+10B4, U+2D14, U+10E4, U+1CA4
- Alphabetical position: 24

History
- Development: 𓃻?: 𐤒; Ϙ ϙ; Φ φ; Ⴔ ⴔ ფ Ფ
- Time period: c. 430 to present
- Transliterations: P, P’, P‘

Other
- Associated numbers: 500
- Writing direction: Left-to-right

Pari, or Phar (Asomtavruli: Ⴔ; Nuskhuri: ⴔ; Mkhedruli: ფ; Mtavruli: Ფ; Georgian: ფარი, ფარი) is the 24th letter of the three Georgian scripts.

In the system of Georgian numerals, it has a value of 500. Pari represents the voiceless bilabial (aspirated) plosive /p⁽ʰ⁾/, like the pronunciation of ⟨p⟩ in "part" or "pan". It is typically romanized with the letter P, P’ or P‘.

== Letter ==
asomtavruli	nuskhuri	mkhedruli	mtavruli

=== Three-dimensional ===
asomtavruli

nuskhuri

mkhedruli

=== Stroke order ===
asomtavruli

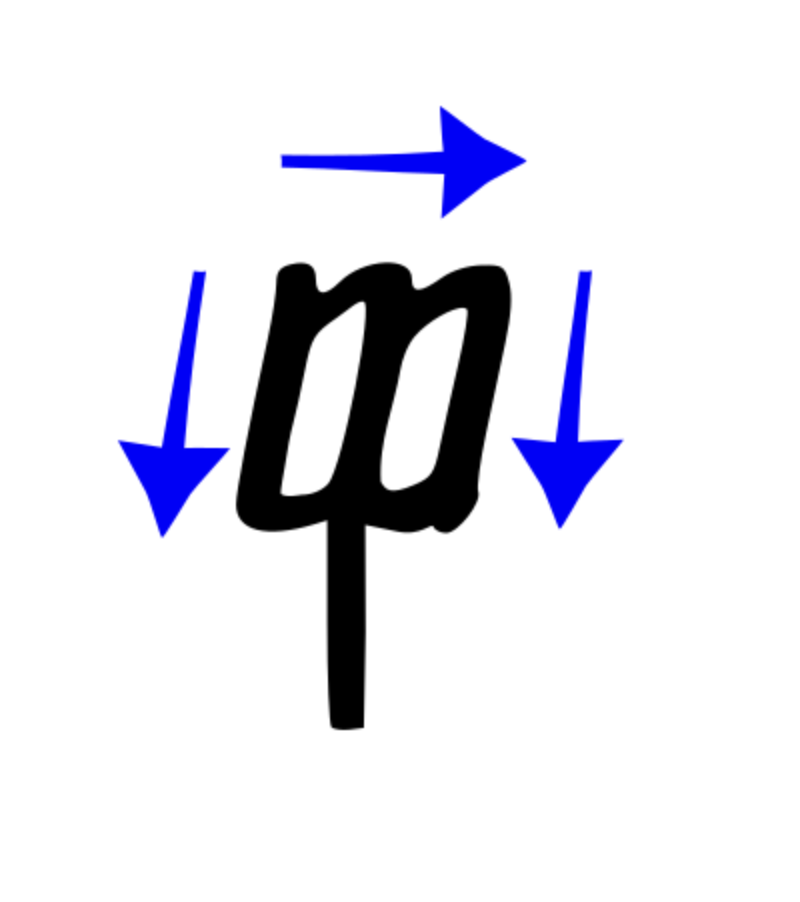
nuskhuri

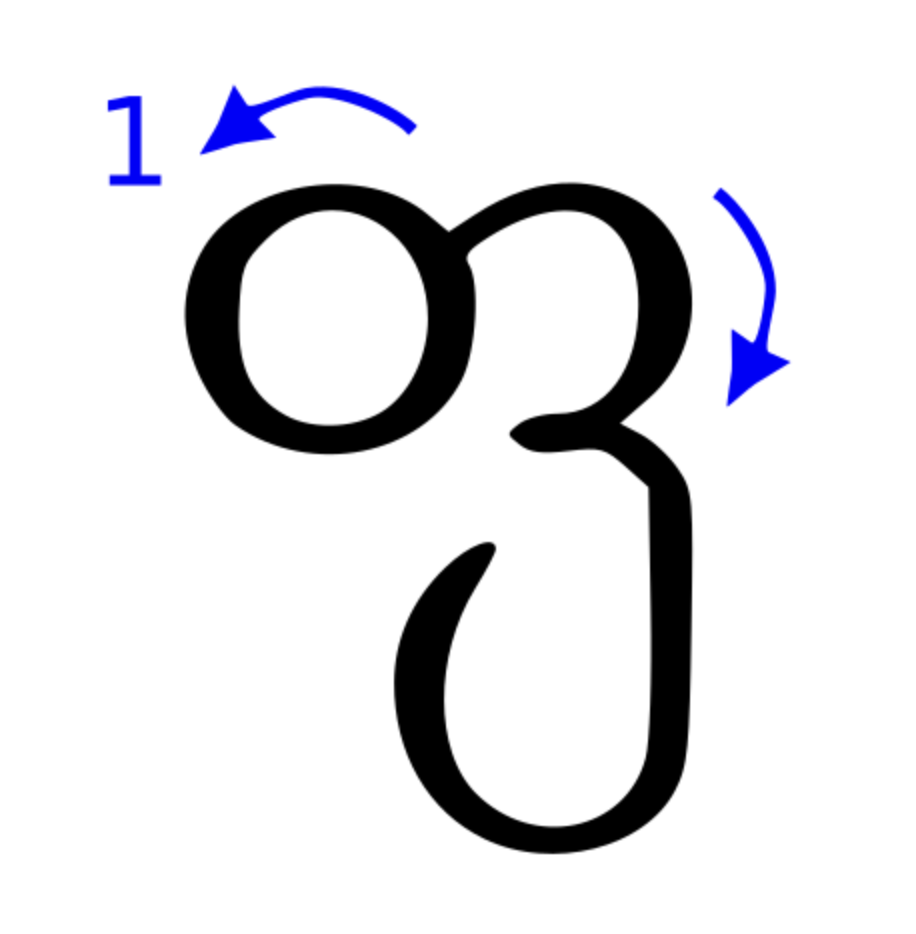
mkhedruli

== Computer encodings ==
Character information
Preview	Ⴔ		ⴔ		ფ		Ფ	
Unicode name	GEORGIAN CAPITAL LETTER PHAR		GEORGIAN SMALL LETTER PHAR		GEORGIAN LETTER PHAR		GEORGIAN MTAVRULI CAPITAL LETTER PHAR	
Encodings	decimal	hex	dec	hex	dec	hex	dec	hex
Unicode	4276	U+10B4	11540	U+2D14	4324	U+10E4	7332	U+1CA4
UTF-8	225 130 180	E1 82 B4	226 180 148	E2 B4 94	225 131 164	E1 83 A4	225 178 164	E1 B2 A4
Numeric character reference	&#4276;	&#x10B4;	&#11540;	&#x2D14;	&#4324;	&#x10E4;	&#7332;	&#x1CA4;

== Braille ==
mkhedruli

== See also ==
- Georgian letter P'ari
- Georgian letter Fi
- Greek letter Phi
- Cyrillic letter Ef

== Bibliography ==
- Mchedlidze, T. (1) The restored Georgian alphabet, Fulda, Germany, 2013
- Mchedlidze, T. (2) The Georgian script; Dictionary and guide, Fulda, Germany, 2013
- Machavariani, E. Georgian manuscripts, Tbilisi, 2011
- The Unicode Standard, Version 6.3, (1) Georgian, 1991-2013
- The Unicode Standard, Version 6.3, (2) Georgian Supplement, 1991-2013
