= Georgian numerals =

System of number names used in Georgian

The Georgian numerals are the system of number names used in Georgian, a language spoken in the country of Georgia. The Georgian numerals from 20 to 99 are constructed using a base-20 system, similar to the scheme used in Basque, French for numbers 80 through 99, or the notion of the score in English.

The symbols for numbers in modern Georgian texts are the same Arabic numerals used in English, except that the comma is used as the decimal separator, and digits in large numbers are divided into groups of three using spaces or periods (full stops). An older method for writing numerals exists in which most of the letters of the Georgian alphabet (including some obsolete letters) are each assigned a numeric value.

== Cardinal numbers ==
The Georgian cardinal numerals up to ten are primitives, as are the words for 20 and 100, and also "million", "billion", etc. (The word for 1000, though, is not a primitive.) Other cardinal numbers are formed from these primitives via a mixture of decimal (base-10) and vigesimal (base-20) structural principles.

The following chart shows the nominative forms of the primitive numbers. Except for rva (8) and tskhra (9), these words are all consonant-final stems and may lose the final i in certain situations.

0	1	2	3	4	5	6	7	8	9	10	20	100	10^{6}	10^{9}
ნული nuli	ერთი erti	ორი ori	სამი sami	ოთხი otkhi	ხუთი khuti	ექვსი ekvsi	შვიდი švidi	რვა rva	ცხრა tskhra	ათი ati	ოცი otsi	ასი asi	მილიონი milioni	მილიარდი miliardi

Numbers from 11 to 19 are formed from 1 through 9, respectively, by prefixing t- (a shortened form of ati, 10) and adding met'i 'more'. In some cases, the prefixed t- coalesces with the initial consonant of the root word to form a single consonant (t + s → ts; t + š → č; t + ts → ts), or induces metathesis in the root (t + rv → tvr).

11	12	13	14	15	16	17	18	19
თერთმეტი tertmet'i	თორმეტი tormet'i	ცამეტი tsamet'i	თოთხმეტი totkhmet'i	თხუთმეტი tkhutmet'i	თექვსმეტი tekvsmet'i	ჩვიდმეტი čvidmet'i	თვრამეტი tvramet'i	ცხრამეტი tskhramet'i

Numbers between 20 and 99 use a vigesimal (base-20) system (comparable to 60–99 in French). 40, 60, and 80 are formed using 2, 3, and 4 (respectively), linked to the word for 20 by m (a vestigial multiplicative):

20	40	60	80
ოცი otsi	ორმოცი ormotsi	სამოცი samotsi	ოთხმოცი otkhmotsi

Any other number between 21 and 99 is formed using 20, 40, 60, or 80, dropping the final i, then adding da (= and) followed by the appropriate number from 1 to 19; e.g.:

21	30	38	47	99
ოცდაერთი otsdaerti (20 + 1)	ოცდაათი otsdaati (20 + 10)	ოცდათვრამეტი otsdatvramet'i (20 + 18)	ორმოცდაშვიდი ormotsdašvidi (2 x 20 + 7)	ოთხმოცდაცხრამეტი otkhmotsdatskhramet'i (4 x 20 + 19)

The hundreds are formed by linking 2, 3, . . ., 10 directly to the word for 100 (without the multiplicative m used for 40, 60, and 80). 1000 is expressed as atasi (10 x 100), and multiples of 1000 are expressed using atasi — so, for example, 2000 is ori atasi (2 x 10 x 100).

100	200	300	400	500	600	700	800	900	1000	2000	10 000
ასი asi	ორასი orasi	სამასი samasi	ოთხასი otkhasi	ხუთასი khutasi	ექვსასი ekvsasi	შვიდასი švidasi	რვაასი rvaasi	ცხრაასი tskhraasi	ათასი atasi	ორი ათასი ori atasi	ათი ათასი ati atasi

The final i is dropped when a smaller number is added to a multiple of 100; e.g.:

250	310	415	2010
ორას ორმოცდაათი oras ormotsdaati	სამას ათი samas ati	ოთხას თხუთმეტი otkhas tkhutmet'i	ორი ათას ათი ori atas ati

== Numeric values of letters ==
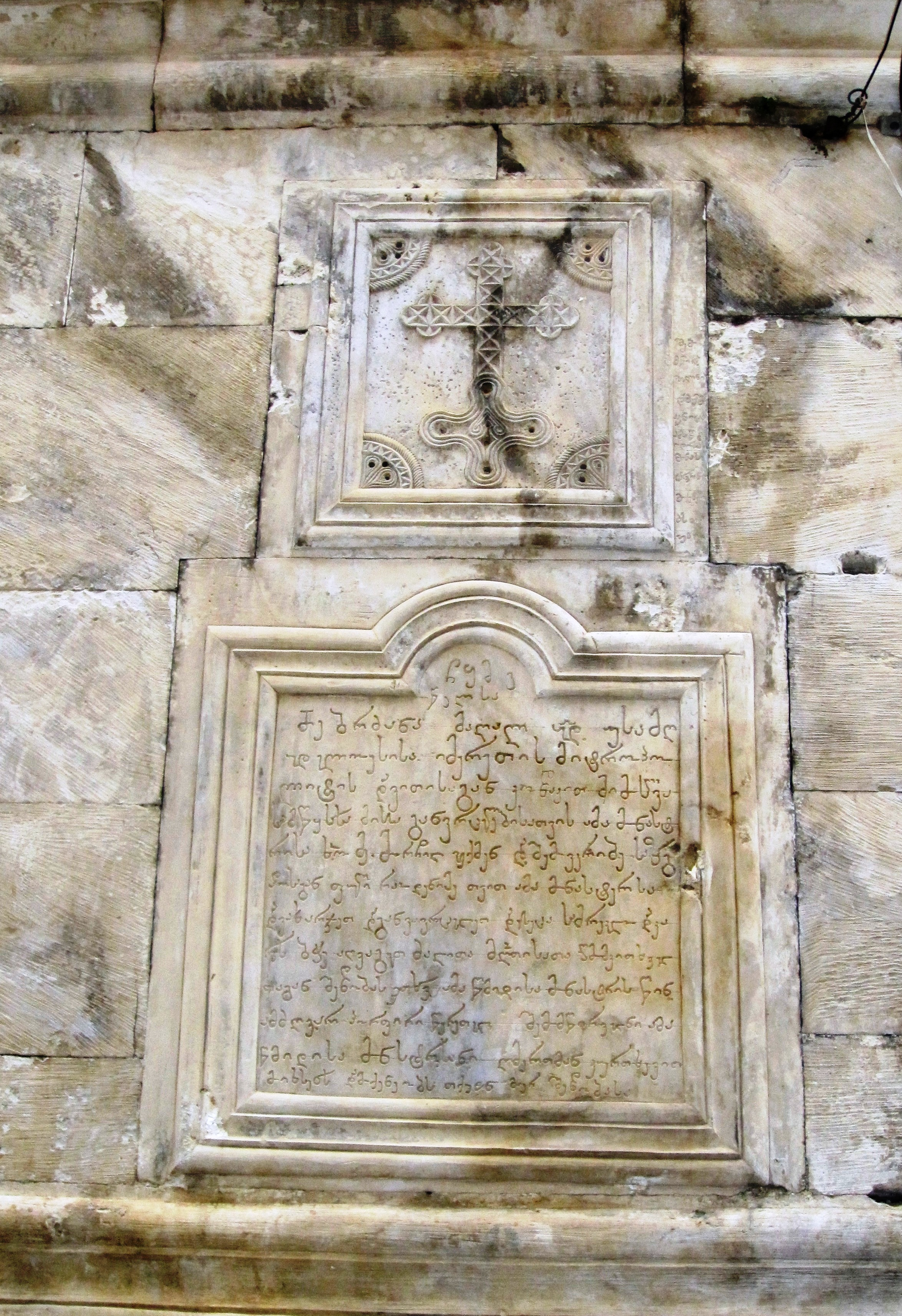
An inscription at the Motsameta monastery, dating the expansion of the convent to ჩყმვ (1846)

The Georgian numeral system (Georgian: ქართული ანბანის სათვალავი) is a system of representing numbers using letters of the Georgian alphabet. Numerical values in this system are obtained by simple addition of the component numerals, which are written greatest-to-least from left to right (e.g., ჩღჲთ = 1769, ჩყპზ = 1887, ციბ = 2012).

Georgian	Value
ა	1
ბ	2
გ	3
დ	4
ე	5
ვ	6
ზ	7
ჱ	8
თ	9
ი	10
კ	20
ლ	30
მ	40
ნ	50
ჲ	60
ო	70
პ	80
ჟ	90
რ	100
ს	200
ტ	300
ჳ	400*
უ	400*
ფ	500
ქ	600
ღ	700
ყ	800
შ	900
ჩ	1000
ც	2000
ძ	3000
წ	4000
ჭ	5000
ხ	6000
ჴ	7000
ჯ	8000
ჰ	9000
ჵ	10000

*Both letters ჳ and უ are equal to 400 in numerical value.

ჶ
ჷ
ჸ
ჹ
ჺ
ჼ
჻

These letters have no numerical value.

== See also ==
- Georgian calendar
