= Georgian calendar =

Ancient or modern calendar of Georgia

The Georgian calendar (Georgian: ქართული კალენდარი) is the ancient or modern calendar of Georgia.

Though Georgia now uses the Gregorian calendar, the old names corresponding to the months are still used.

== Old month names ==
Month	Georgian name	Transliteration	Meaning	References
January	აპნისი	Ap'nisi	Month of Waters	
February	სურწყუნისი	Surts'q'unisi	Month of Divine Waters	
March	მირკანი	Mirk'ani	Month of Mithras	
April	იგრიკა	Igrik'a	Month of the Sun	
May	ვარდობისთვე	Vardobistve	Month of Roses	
June	თიბათვე	Tibatve	Month of Mowing	
July	მკათათვე	Mk'atatve	Month of Reaping	
August	მარიამობისთვე	Mariamobistve	Month of Virgin Mary	
September	ახალწლისა ენკენისთვე	Akhalts'lisa Enk'enistve	Month of New Year (Note: The New Year in ancient Georgia began in September.)	
October	ღვინობისთვე	Ghvinobistve	Month of Wine	
November	გიორგობისთვე	Giorgobistve	Month of Saint George	
December	ქრისტეშობისთვე	Krist'eshobistve	Month of Christmas	

== Modern month names ==
Month	Georgian name	Transliteration	References
January	იანვარი	Ianvari	
February	თებერვალი	Tebervali	
March	მარტი	Mart'i	
April	აპრილი	Ap'rili	
May	მაისი	Maisi	
June	ივნისი	Ivnisi	
July	ივლისი	Ivlisi	
August	აგვისტო	Agvist'o	
September	სექტემბერი	Sekt'emberi	
October	ოქტომბერი	Okt'omberi	
November	ნოემბერი	Noemberi	
December	დეკემბერი	Dek'emberi	

== See also ==
- Georgian numerals
- Georgian alphabet
