= K'ani =

11th letter of the three Georgian scripts

- Ⴉ ⴉ კ Კ

Usage
- Writing system: Georgian script
- Type: Alphabetic
- Language of origin: Georgian language
- Sound values: [kʼ]
- In Unicode: U+10A9, U+2D09, U+10D9, U+1C99
- Alphabetical position: 11

History
- Time period: c. 430 to present
- Transliterations: K, K’, Ḳ, Ķ

Other
- Associated numbers: 20
- Writing direction: Left-to-right

K'ani, or Kan (Asomtavruli: Ⴉ; Nuskhuri: ⴉ; Mkhedruli: კ, Mtavruli: Კ; Georgian: კანი, კან) is the 11th letter of the three Georgian scripts.

In the system of Georgian numerals, it has a value of 20. K'ani represents a velar ejective stop /kʼ/. As an ejective consonant, the airstream in its pronunciation is not produced in the lungs, but in the glottis. In the Georgian language, it is distinct from a non-ejective velar consonant, represented by the letter Kani. It is typically romanized with the letter K, K’, Ḳ or Ķ.

== Letter ==
asomtavruli	nuskhuri	mkhedruli	mtavruli

=== Three-dimensional ===
asomtavruli

nuskhuri

mkhedruli

=== Stroke order ===
asomtavruli

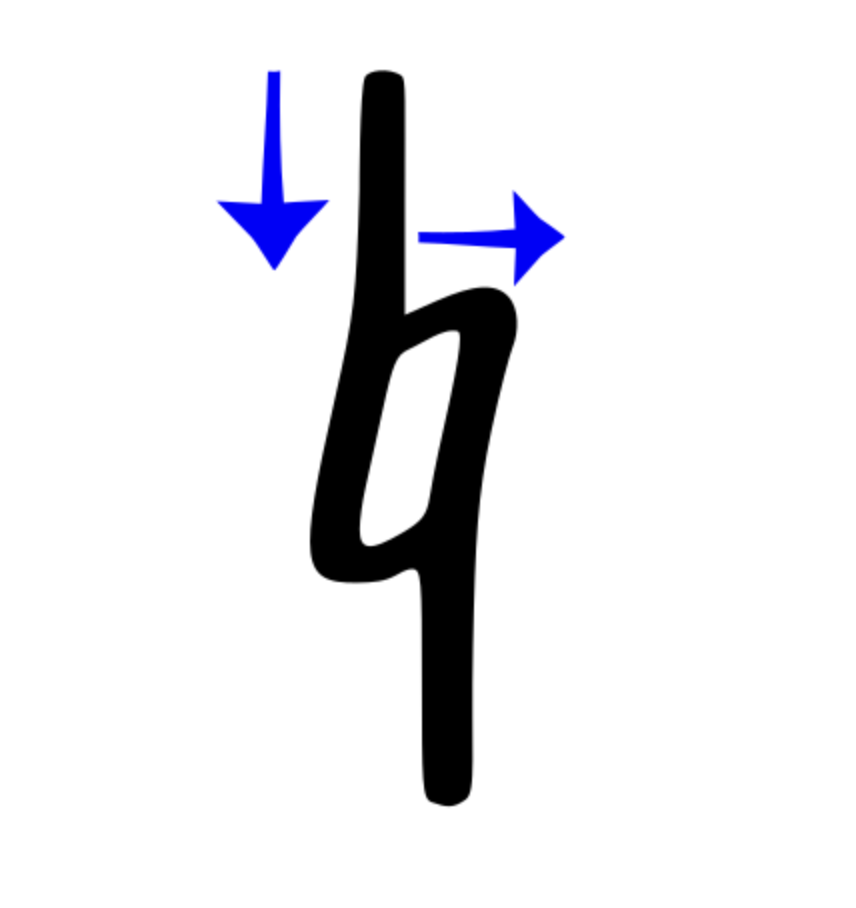
nuskhuri

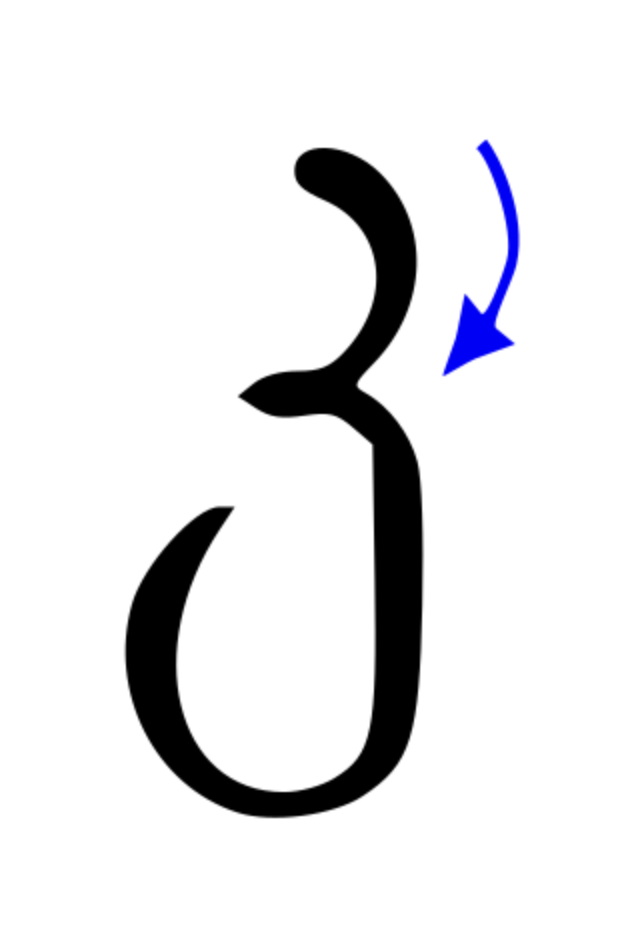
mkhedruli

== Computer encodings ==
Character information
Preview	Ⴉ		ⴉ		კ		Კ	
Unicode name	GEORGIAN CAPITAL LETTER KAN		GEORGIAN SMALL LETTER KAN		GEORGIAN LETTER KAN		GEORGIAN MTAVRULI CAPITAL LETTER KAN	
Encodings	decimal	hex	dec	hex	dec	hex	dec	hex
Unicode	4265	U+10A9	11529	U+2D09	4313	U+10D9	7321	U+1C99
UTF-8	225 130 169	E1 82 A9	226 180 137	E2 B4 89	225 131 153	E1 83 99	225 178 153	E1 B2 99
Numeric character reference	&#4265;	&#x10A9;	&#11529;	&#x2D09;	&#4313;	&#x10D9;	&#7321;	&#x1C99;

== Braille ==
mkhedruli

== See also ==
- Kani (letter)

== Bibliography ==
- Mchedlidze, T. (1) The restored Georgian alphabet, Fulda, Germany, 2013
- Mchedlidze, T. (2) The Georgian script; Dictionary and guide, Fulda, Germany, 2013
- Machavariani, E. Georgian manuscripts, Tbilisi, 2011
- The Unicode Standard, Version 6.3, (1) Georgian, 1991-2013
- The Unicode Standard, Version 6.3, (2) Georgian Supplement, 1991-2013
