= Kani (letter) =

25th letter of the three Georgian scripts

- Ⴕ ⴕ ქ Ქ

Usage
- Writing system: Georgian script
- Type: Alphabetic
- Language of origin: Georgian language
- Sound values: [k⁽ʰ⁾]
- In Unicode: U+10B5, U+2D15, U+10E5, U+1CA5
- Alphabetical position: 25

History
- Development: 𓊽: 𐤎; 𐊑; 𐊐 χ; Ⴕ ⴕ ქ Ქ
- Time period: c. 430 to present
- Transliterations: K, K’, K‘

Other
- Associated numbers: 600
- Writing direction: Left-to-right

Kani, Kan or Khar (Note: Unicode name of this letter) (Asomtavruli: Ⴕ; Nuskhuri: ⴕ; Mkhedruli: ქ; Mtavruli: Ქ; Georgian: ქანი, ქან) is the 25th letter of the three Georgian scripts.

In the system of Georgian numerals, it has a value of 600. Kani commonly represents the voiceless velar plosive /k/, like the pronunciation of ⟨k⟩ in "king" or the pronunciation of ⟨c⟩ in "can". It is typically romanized with the letter K, K’ or K‘.

== Letter ==
| asomtavruli | nuskhuri | mkhedruli | mtavruli |

=== Three-dimensional ===
asomtavruli

nuskhuri

mkhedruli

=== Stroke order ===
asomtavruli

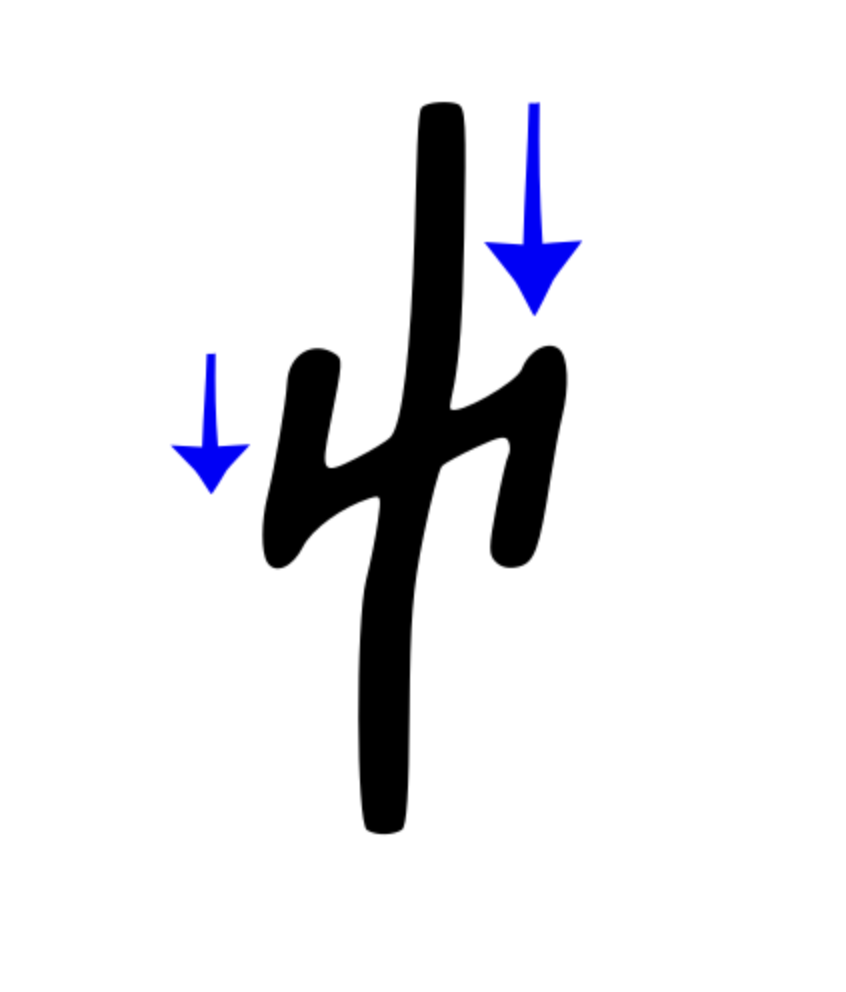
nuskhuri

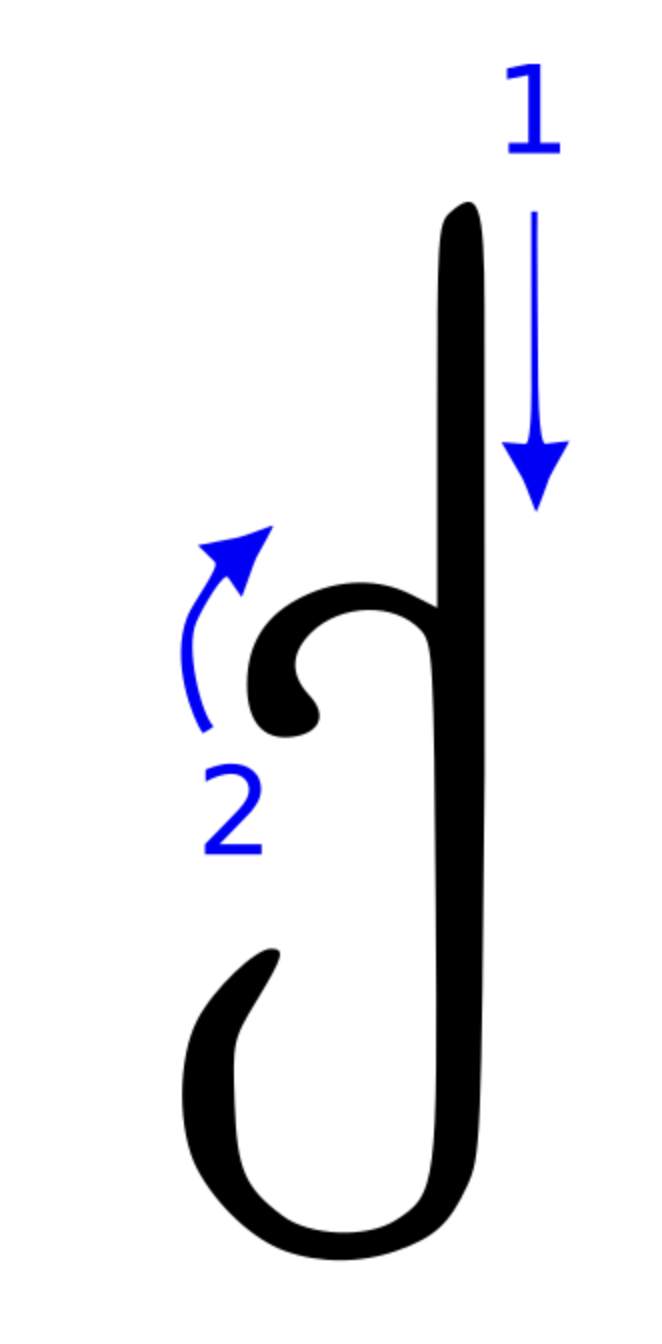
mkhedruli

== Computer encodings ==
Character information
| Preview | Ⴕ | | ⴕ | | ქ | | Ქ | |
|---|---|---|---|---|---|---|---|---|
| Unicode name | GEORGIAN CAPITAL LETTER KHAR | | GEORGIAN SMALL LETTER KHAR | | GEORGIAN LETTER KHAR | | GEORGIAN MTAVRULI CAPITAL LETTER KHAR | |
| Encodings | decimal | hex | dec | hex | dec | hex | dec | hex |
| Unicode | 4277 | U+10B5 | 11541 | U+2D15 | 4325 | U+10E5 | 7333 | U+1CA5 |
| UTF-8 | 225 130 181 | E1 82 B5 | 226 180 149 | E2 B4 95 | 225 131 165 | E1 83 A5 | 225 178 165 | E1 B2 A5 |
| Numeric character reference | &#4277; | &#x10B5; | &#11541; | &#x2D15; | &#4325; | &#x10E5; | &#7333; | &#x1CA5; |

== Braille ==
mkhedruli

== See also ==
- Georgian letter K'ani
- Greek letter Chi
- Cyrillic letter Kha

== Bibliography ==
- Mchedlidze, T. (1) The restored Georgian alphabet, Fulda, Germany, 2013
- Mchedlidze, T. (2) The Georgian script; Dictionary and guide, Fulda, Germany, 2013
- Machavariani, E. Georgian manuscripts, Tbilisi, 2011
- The Unicode Standard, Version 6.3, (1) Georgian, 1991-2013
- The Unicode Standard, Version 6.3, (2) Georgian Supplement, 1991-2013
