= Eni (letter) =

5th letter of the three Georgian scripts

- Ⴄ ⴄ ე Ე

Usage
- Writing system: Georgian script
- Type: Alphabetic
- Language of origin: Georgian language
- Sound values: [e̞]
- In Unicode: U+10A4, U+2D04, U+10D4, U+1C94
- Alphabetical position: 5

History
- Time period: c. 430 to present
- Transliterations: E

Other
- Associated numbers: 5
- Writing direction: Left-to-right

Eni, or En (Asomtavruli: Ⴄ; Nuskhuri: ⴄ; Mkhedruli: ე; Mtavruli: Ე; Georgian: ენი, ენ) is the 5th letter of the three Georgian scripts.

In the system of Georgian numerals, it has a value of 5. Eni commonly represents the mid front unrounded vowel /e̞/, like between the pronunciation of ⟨e⟩ in "embassy" and the pronunciation of ⟨e⟩ in "bed" (General Australian). It is typically romanized with the letter E.

An additional mkhedruli eni letter, ე̄ with a macron is used in Svan language.

== Letter ==
asomtavruli	nuskhuri	mkhedruli	mtavruli

=== Three-dimensional ===
asomtavruli

nuskhuri

mkhedruli

=== Stroke order ===
asomtavruli

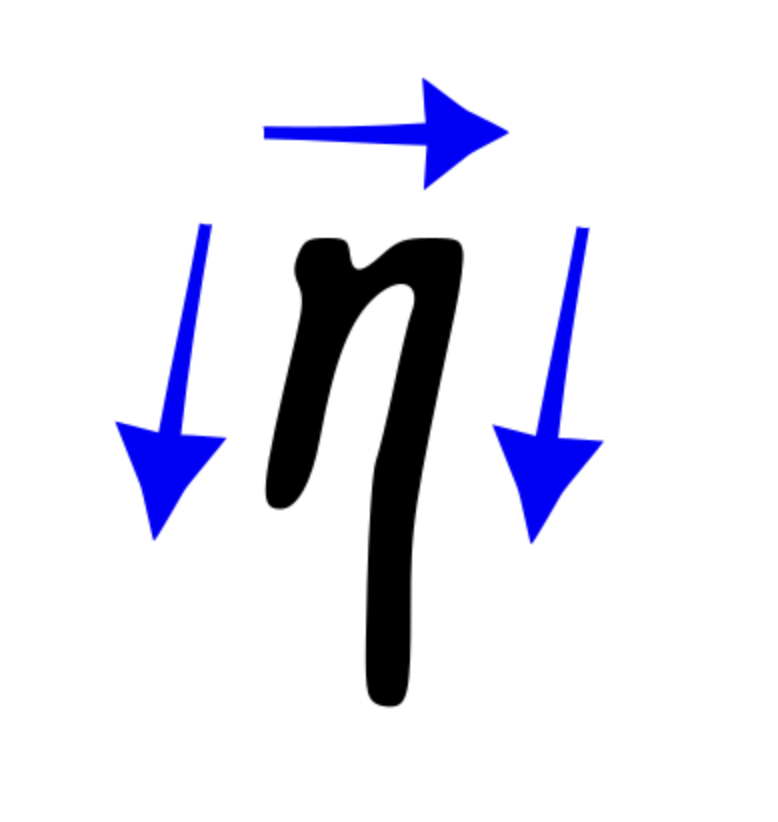
nuskhuri

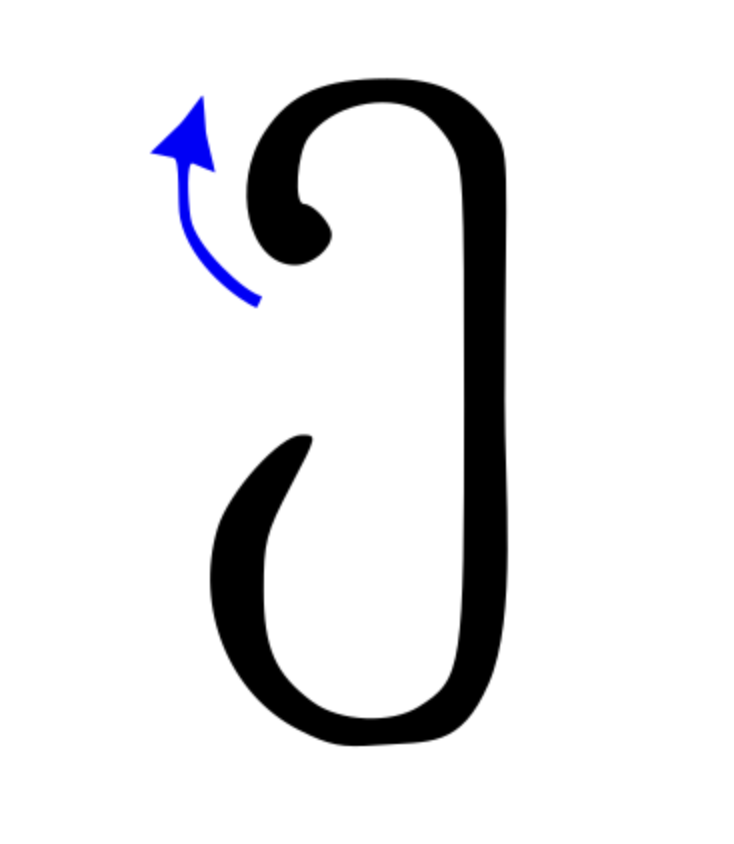
mkhedruli

== Computer encodings ==
Character information
Preview	Ⴄ		ⴄ		ე		Ე	
Unicode name	GEORGIAN CAPITAL LETTER EN		GEORGIAN SMALL LETTER EN		GEORGIAN LETTER EN		GEORGIAN MTAVRULI CAPITAL LETTER EN	
Encodings	decimal	hex	dec	hex	dec	hex	dec	hex
Unicode	4260	U+10A4	11524	U+2D04	4308	U+10D4	7316	U+1C94
UTF-8	225 130 164	E1 82 A4	226 180 132	E2 B4 84	225 131 148	E1 83 94	225 178 148	E1 B2 94
Numeric character reference	&#4260;	&#x10A4;	&#11524;	&#x2D04;	&#4308;	&#x10D4;	&#7316;	&#x1C94;

== With diacritic ==
ე̄
U+10D4
U+0304

== Braille ==
mkhedruli

== See also ==
- Latin letter E
- Cyrillic letter E

== Bibliography ==
- Mchedlidze, T. (1) The restored Georgian alphabet, Fulda, Germany, 2013
- Mchedlidze, T. (2) The Georgian script; Dictionary and guide, Fulda, Germany, 2013
- Machavariani, E. Georgian manuscripts, Tbilisi, 2011
- The Unicode Standard, Version 6.3, (1) Georgian, 1991-2013
- The Unicode Standard, Version 6.3, (2) Georgian Supplement, 1991-2013
