= Ie (letter) =

15th letter of the three Georgian scripts

- Ⴢ ⴢ ჲ Ჲ

Usage
- Writing system: Georgian script
- Type: Alphabetic
- Language of origin: Georgian language
- Sound values: [j]
- In Unicode: U+10C2, U+2D22, U+10F2, U+1CB2
- Alphabetical position: 15

History
- Time period: c. 430 to present
- Transliterations: J, Y

Other
- Associated numbers: 60
- Writing direction: Left-to-right

Ie, Hie, or Iota (Asomtavruli: Ⴢ; Nuskhuri: ⴢ; Mkhedruli: ჲ; Mtavruli: Ჲ; Georgian: იე, იოტა, ჲოტა) is the 15th letter of the three Georgian scripts.

Historically, this letter was used instead of ი (i) after vowels. It represents the voiced palatal approximant /j/. In the system of Georgian numerals it has a value of 60. It is now obsolete in the Georgian language, replaced by ი (i) due to its identical pronunciation. Currently, it is used in the Svan, Mingrelian and the Laz languages. It is typically romanized with the letter J or Y.

== Letter ==
asomtavruli	nuskhuri	mkhedruli	mtavruli

=== Three-dimensional ===
asomtavruli

nuskhuri

mkhedruli

=== Stroke order ===
asomtavruli

== Computer encodings ==
Character information
Preview	Ⴢ		ⴢ		ჲ		Ჲ	
Unicode name	GEORGIAN CAPITAL LETTER HIE		GEORGIAN SMALL LETTER HIE		GEORGIAN LETTER HIE		GEORGIAN MTAVRULI CAPITAL LETTER HIE	
Encodings	decimal	hex	dec	hex	dec	hex	dec	hex
Unicode	4290	U+10C2	11554	U+2D22	4338	U+10F2	7346	U+1CB2
UTF-8	225 131 130	E1 83 82	226 180 162	E2 B4 A2	225 131 178	E1 83 B2	225 178 178	E1 B2 B2
Numeric character reference	&#4290;	&#x10C2;	&#11554;	&#x2D22;	&#4338;	&#x10F2;	&#7346;	&#x1CB2;

== See also ==
- Iota
- Short I

== Bibliography ==
- Mchedlidze, T. (1) The restored Georgian alphabet, Fulda, Germany, 2013
- Mchedlidze, T. (2) The Georgian script; Dictionary and guide, Fulda, Germany, 2013
- Machavariani, E. Georgian manuscripts, Tbilisi, 2011
- The Unicode Standard, Version 6.3, (1) Georgian, 1991-2013
- The Unicode Standard, Version 6.3, (2) Georgian Supplement, 1991-2013
