= Hae (letter) =

37th letter of the three Georgian scripts

- Ⴠ ⴠ ჰ Ჰ

Usage
- Writing system: Georgian script
- Type: Alphabetic
- Language of origin: Georgian language
- Sound values: [h]

History
- Time period: c. 430 to present

Other
- Writing direction: Left-to-right

Hae (Asomtavruli: Ⴠ, Nuskhuri: ⴠ, Mkhedruli: ჰ, Mtavruli: Ჰ) is the 37th letter of the three Georgian scripts.

In the system of Georgian numerals it has a value of 9000. Hae commonly represents the voiceless glottal fricative /h/, like the pronunciation of ⟨h⟩ in "head". It is typically romanized with the letter H.

== Letter ==
| asomtavruli | nuskhuri | mkhedruli | mtavruli |

=== Three-dimensional ===
asomtavruli

nuskhuri

mkhedruli

=== Stroke order ===
asomtavruli

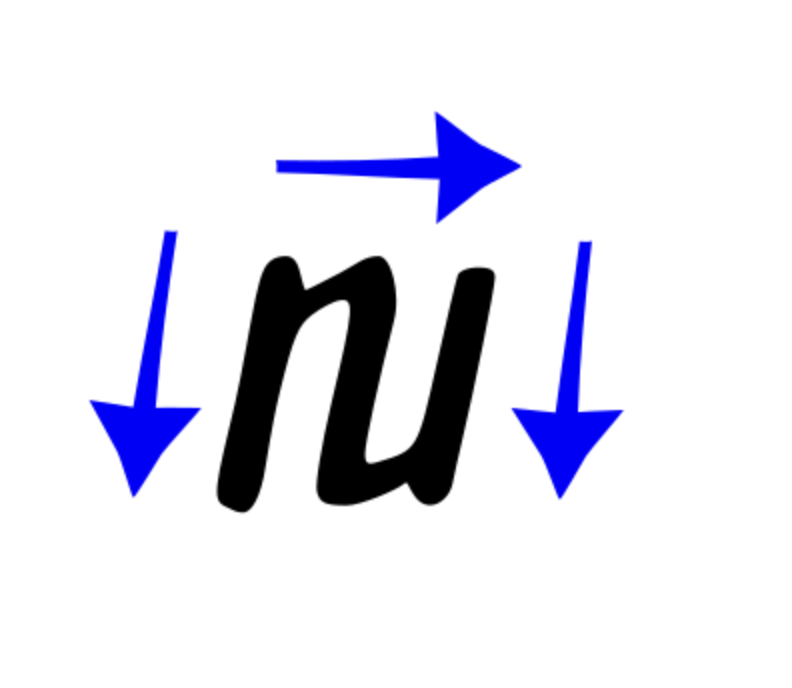
nuskhuri

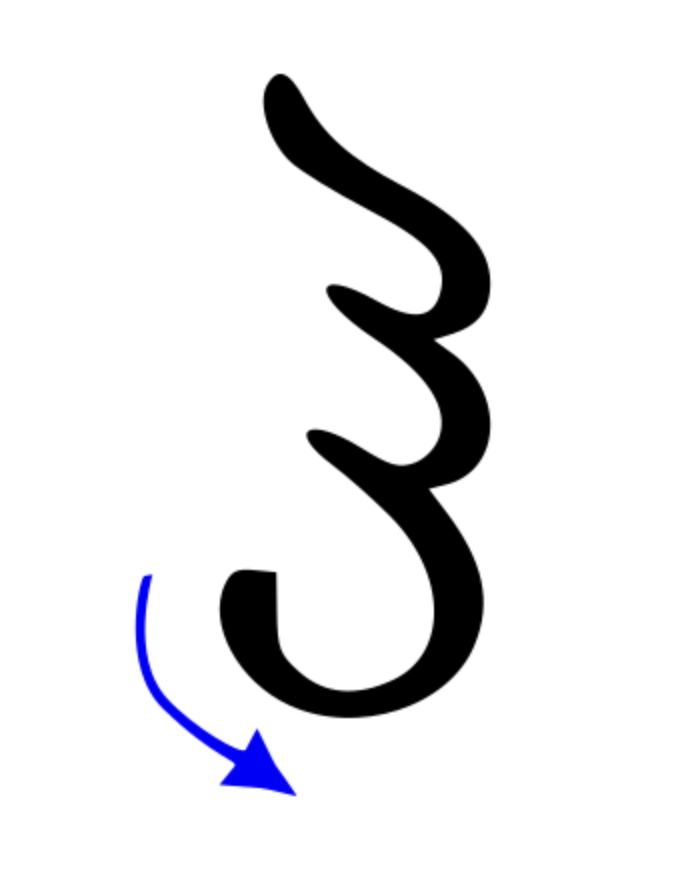
mkhedruli

== Computer encodings ==
Character information
| Preview | Ⴠ | | ⴠ | | ჰ | | Ჰ | |
|---|---|---|---|---|---|---|---|---|
| Unicode name | GEORGIAN CAPITAL LETTER HAE | | GEORGIAN SMALL LETTER HAE | | GEORGIAN LETTER HAE | | GEORGIAN MTAVRULI LETTER HAE | |
| Encodings | decimal | hex | dec | hex | dec | hex | dec | hex |
| Unicode | 4288 | U+10C0 | 11552 | U+2D20 | 4336 | U+10F0 | 7344 | U+1CB0 |
| UTF-8 | 225 131 128 | E1 83 80 | 226 180 160 | E2 B4 A0 | 225 131 176 | E1 83 B0 | 225 178 176 | E1 B2 B0 |
| Numeric character reference | &#4288; | &#x10C0; | &#11552; | &#x2D20; | &#4336; | &#x10F0; | &#7344; | &#x1CB0; |

== Braille ==
mkhedruli

== See also ==
- Latin letter H

== Bibliography ==
- Mchedlidze, T. (1) The restored Georgian alphabet, Fulda, Germany, 2013
- Mchedlidze, T. (2) The Georgian script; Dictionary and guide, Fulda, Germany, 2013
- Machavariani, E. Georgian manuscripts, Tbilisi, 2011
- The Unicode Standard, Version 6.3, (1) Georgian, 1991–2013
- The Unicode Standard, Version 6.3, (2) Georgian Supplement, 1991–2013
