= P'ari =

17th letter of the three Georgian scripts

- Ⴎ ⴎ პ Პ

Usage
- Writing system: Georgian script
- Type: Alphabetic
- Language of origin: Georgian language
- Sound values: [p’]
- In Unicode: U+10AE, U+2D0E, U+10DE, U+1C9E
- Alphabetical position: 17

History
- Time period: c. 430 to present
- Transliterations: P, P’, Ṗ

Other
- Associated numbers: 80
- Writing direction: Left-to-right

P'ari, or Par (Asomtavruli: Ⴎ; Nuskhuri: ⴎ; Mkhedruli: პ; Mtavruli: Პ; Georgian: პარი, პარ) is the 17th letter of the three Georgian scripts.

In the system of Georgian numerals, it has a value of 80. It represents the voiceless bilabial ejective /p’/. It is typically romanized with the letter P, P’ or with the letter P with a dot above (Ṗ).

== Letter ==
asomtavruli	nuskhuri	mkhedruli	mtavruli

=== Three-dimensional ===
asomtavruli

nuskhuri

mkhedruli

=== Stroke order ===
asomtavruli

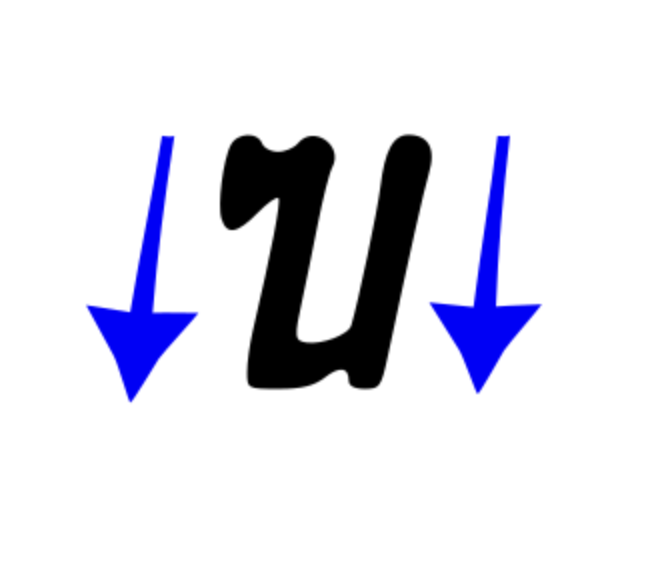
nuskhuri

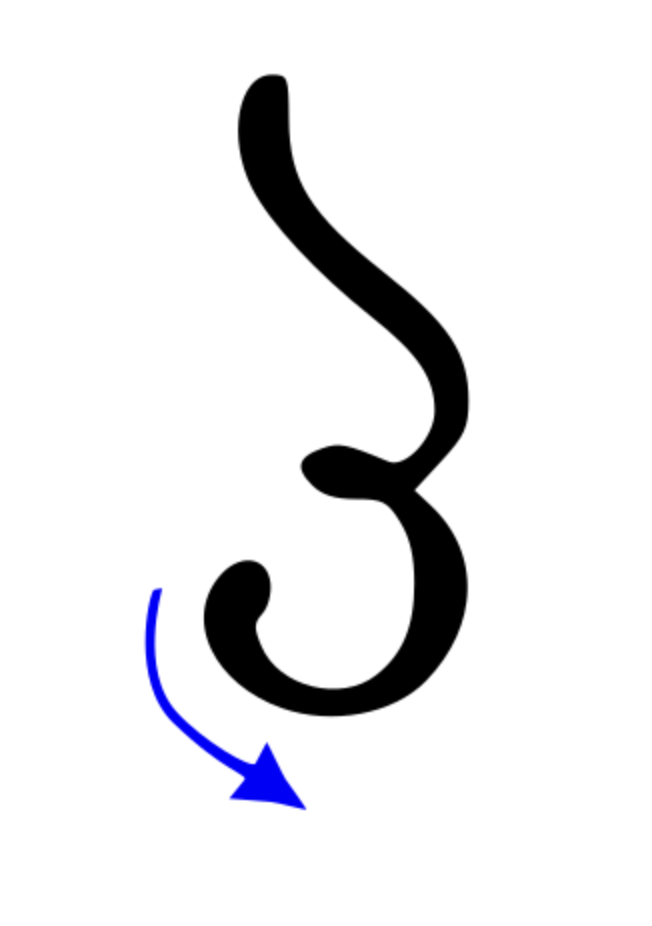
mkhedruli

== Computer encodings ==
Character information
Preview	Ⴎ		ⴎ		პ		Პ	
Unicode name	GEORGIAN CAPITAL LETTER PAR		GEORGIAN SMALL LETTER PAR		GEORGIAN LETTER PAR		GEORGIAN MTAVRULI CAPITAL LETTER PAR	
Encodings	decimal	hex	dec	hex	dec	hex	dec	hex
Unicode	4270	U+10AE	11534	U+2D0E	4318	U+10DE	7326	U+1C9E
UTF-8	225 130 174	E1 82 AE	226 180 142	E2 B4 8E	225 131 158	E1 83 9E	225 178 158	E1 B2 9E
Numeric character reference	&#4270;	&#x10AE;	&#11534;	&#x2D0E;	&#4318;	&#x10DE;	&#7326;	&#x1C9E;

== Braille ==
mkhedruli

== See also ==
- Latin letter P
- Cyrillic letter Pe
- Georgian letter Pari

== Bibliography ==
- Mchedlidze, T. (1) The restored Georgian alphabet, Fulda, Germany, 2013
- Mchedlidze, T. (2) The Georgian script; Dictionary and guide, Fulda, Germany, 2013
- Machavariani, E. Georgian manuscripts, Tbilisi, 2011
- The Unicode Standard, Version 6.3, (1) Georgian, 1991-2013
- The Unicode Standard, Version 6.3, (2) Georgian Supplement, 1991-2013
