= Tani (letter) =

9th letter of the three Georgian scripts

- Ⴇ ⴇ თ Თ

Usage
- Writing system: Georgian script
- Type: Alphabetic
- Language of origin: Georgian language
- Sound values: [t̪⁽ʰ⁾]
- In Unicode: U+10A7, U+2D07, U+10D7, U+1C97
- Alphabetical position: 9

History
- Time period: c. 430 to present
- Transliterations: T, T’, Tʻ

Other
- Associated numbers: 9
- Writing direction: Left-to-right

Tani, or Tan (Asomtavruli: Ⴇ; Nuskhuri: ⴇ; Mkhedruli: თ; Mtavruli: Თ; Georgian: თანი, თან) is the 9th letter of the three Georgian scripts.

In the system of Georgian numerals, it has a value of 9. Tani commonly represents the voiceless dental (aspirated) plosive /t̪⁽ʰ⁾/, roughly like the pronunciation of ⟨t⟩ in "time" or "tick". It is typically romanized with the letter T, T’ or Tʻ.

== Letter ==
asomtavruli	nuskhuri	mkhedruli	mtavruli

=== Three-dimensional ===
asomtavruli

nuskhuri

mkhedruli

=== Stroke order ===
asomtavruli

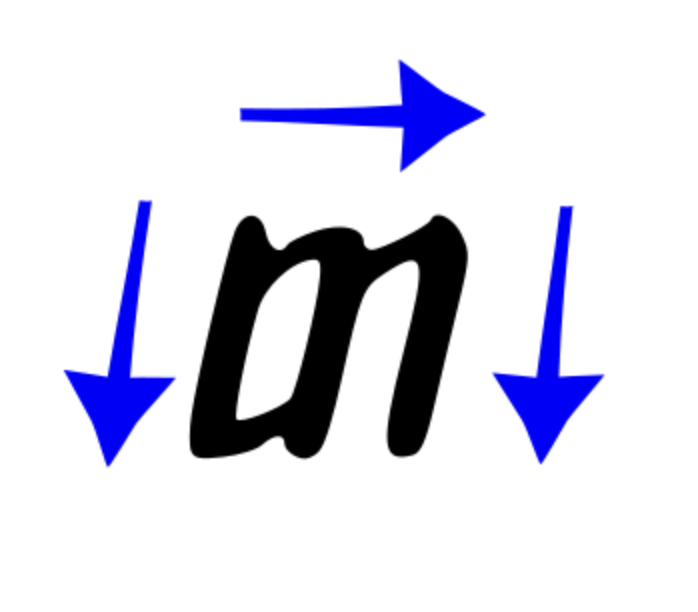
nuskhuri

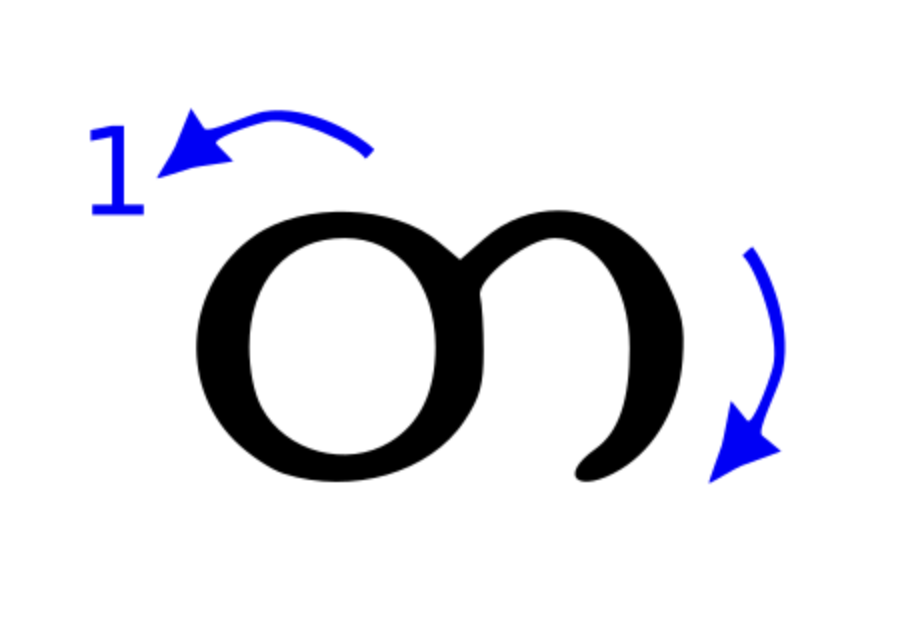
mkhedruli

== Computer encodings ==
Character information
Preview	Ⴇ		ⴇ		თ		Თ	
Unicode name	GEORGIAN CAPITAL LETTER TAN		GEORGIAN SMALL LETTER TAN		GEORGIAN LETTER TAN		GEORGIAN MTAVRULI CAPITAL LETTER TAN	
Encodings	decimal	hex	dec	hex	dec	hex	dec	hex
Unicode	4263	U+10A7	11527	U+2D07	4311	U+10D7	7319	U+1C97
UTF-8	225 130 167	E1 82 A7	226 180 135	E2 B4 87	225 131 151	E1 83 97	225 178 151	E1 B2 97
Numeric character reference	&#4263;	&#x10A7;	&#11527;	&#x2D07;	&#4311;	&#x10D7;	&#7319;	&#x1C97;

== Braille ==
mkhedruli

== See also ==
- T'ari, Georgian letter
- T t, Latin letter
- Τ τ, Greek letter

== Bibliography ==
- Mchedlidze, T. (1) The restored Georgian alphabet, Fulda, Germany, 2013
- Mchedlidze, T. (2) The Georgian script; Dictionary and guide, Fulda, Germany, 2013
- Machavariani, E. Georgian manuscripts, Tbilisi, 2011
- The Unicode Standard, Version 6.3, (1) Georgian, 1991-2013
- The Unicode Standard, Version 6.3, (2) Georgian Supplement, 1991-2013
