= Hoe (letter) =

38th letter of the three Georgian scripts

- Ⴥ ⴥ ჵ Ჵ

Usage
- Writing system: Georgian script
- Type: Alphabetic
- Language of origin: Georgian language
- Sound values: [hoeʼ]

History
- Time period: c. 430 to present

Other
- Writing direction: Left-to-right

Hoe (Asomtavruli: Ⴥ, Nuskhuri: ⴥ, Mkhedruli: ჵ, Mtavruli: Ჵ) is the 38th letter of the three Georgian scripts.

In the system of Georgian numerals it has a value of 10,000. Now obsolete in Georgian, due to it being redundant to the spelling of the exclamation "ჰოი!" ("Hoi!", meaning "Oh!"). It is still used in the alphabet for the Bats language, for the phonemes /ʕ, ɦ/.

== Letter ==
asomtavruli	nuskhuri	mkhedruli	mtavruli

=== Three-dimensional ===
asomtavruli

nuskhuri

mkhedruli

=== Stroke order ===
asomtavruli

== Computer encodings ==
Character information
Preview	Ⴥ		ⴥ		ჵ		Ჵ	
Unicode name	GEORGIAN CAPITAL LETTER HOE		GEORGIAN SMALL LETTER HOE		GEORGIAN LETTER HOE		GEORGIAN MTAVRULI LETTER HOE	
Encodings	decimal	hex	dec	hex	dec	hex	dec	hex
Unicode	4293	U+10C5	11557	U+2D25	4341	U+10F5	7349	U+1CB5
UTF-8	225 131 133	E1 83 85	226 180 165	E2 B4 A5	225 131 181	E1 83 B5	225 178 181	E1 B2 B5
Numeric character reference	&#4293;	&#x10C5;	&#11557;	&#x2D25;	&#4341;	&#x10F5;	&#7349;	&#x1CB5;

== Bibliography ==
- Mchedlidze, T. (1) The restored Georgian alphabet, Fulda, Germany, 2013
- Mchedlidze, T. (2) The Georgian script; Dictionary and guide, Fulda, Germany, 2013
- Machavariani, E. Georgian manuscripts, Tbilisi, 2011
- The Unicode Standard, Version 6.3, (1) Georgian, 1991–2013
- The Unicode Standard, Version 6.3, (2) Georgian Supplement, 1991–2013
