= Fi (letter) =

Additional letter in the Georgian alphabet

- Ჶ ჶ

Usage
- Writing system: Georgian script
- Type: Alphabetic
- Language of origin: Laz language Svan language
- Sound values: [f]
- In Unicode: U+10F6, U+1CB6

History
- Development: 𓃻?: 𐤒; Ϙ ϙ; Φ φ; Ჶ ჶ
- Time period: 20th century-present
- Transliterations: F

Other
- Associated numbers: None
- Writing direction: Left-to-right

Fi (Mkhedruli: ჶ; Mtavruli: Ჶ; Georgian: ჶი) is an additional letter of the Georgian script, now obsolete in Georgian. It was used in the 20th century in words which came from other languages such as: ჶილმი (ფილმი-film) etc. Since this letter is not part of the original Georgian alphabet, it has no numerical value. It is typically romanized with the letter f. Today, the letter is used in the Laz language.

== Letter ==
mkhedruli	mtavruli

=== Three-dimensional ===
mkhedruli

== Computing codes ==
Character information
Preview	ჶ		Ჶ	
Unicode name	GEORGIAN LETTER FI		GEORGIAN MTAVRULI CAPITAL LETTER FI	
Encodings	decimal	hex	dec	hex
Unicode	4342	U+10F6	7350	U+1CB6
UTF-8	225 131 182	E1 83 B6	225 178 182	E1 B2 B6
Numeric character reference	&#4342;	&#x10F6;	&#7350;	&#x1CB6;
