= Vini (letter) =

6th letter of the three Georgian scripts

- Ⴅ ⴅ ვ Ვ

Usage
- Writing system: Georgian script
- Type: Alphabetic
- Language of origin: Georgian language
- Sound values: [v]
- In Unicode: U+10A5, U+2D05, U+10D5, U+1C95
- Alphabetical position: 6

History
- Time period: c. 430 to present
- Transliterations: V

Other
- Associated numbers: 6
- Writing direction: Left-to-right

Vini, or Vin (Asomtavruli: Ⴅ; Nuskhuri: ⴅ; Mkhedruli: ვ; Mtavruli: Ვ; Georgian: ვინი, ვინ) is the 6th letter of the three Georgian scripts.

In the system of Georgian numerals, it has a value of 6. Vini commonly represents the voiced labiodental fricative /v/, like the pronunciation of ⟨v⟩ in "vine". It is typically romanized with the letter V.

== Letter ==
| asomtavruli | nuskhuri | mkhedruli | mtavruli |

=== Three-dimensional ===
asomtavruli

nuskhuri

mkhedruli

=== Stroke order ===
asomtavruli

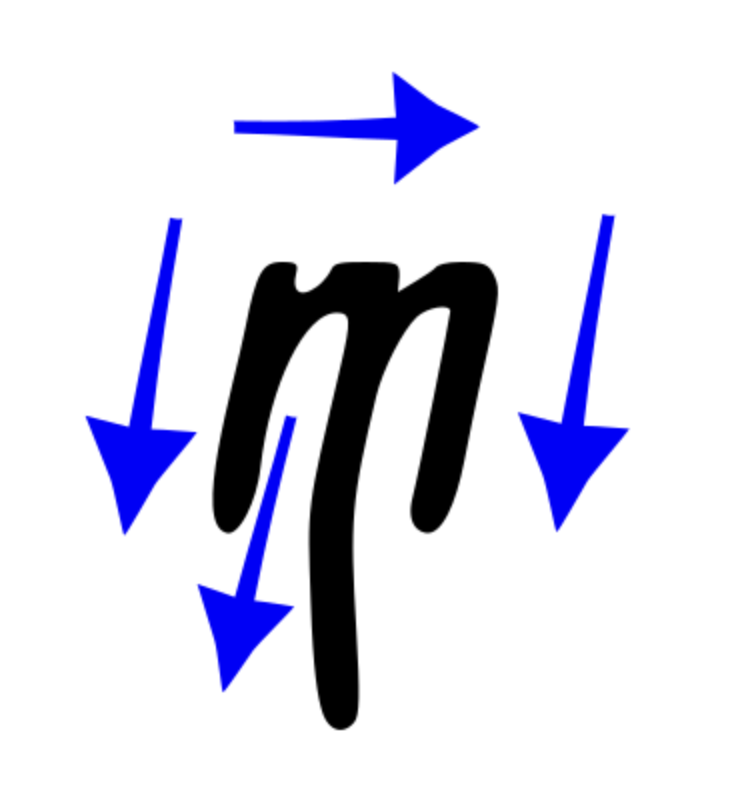
nuskhuri

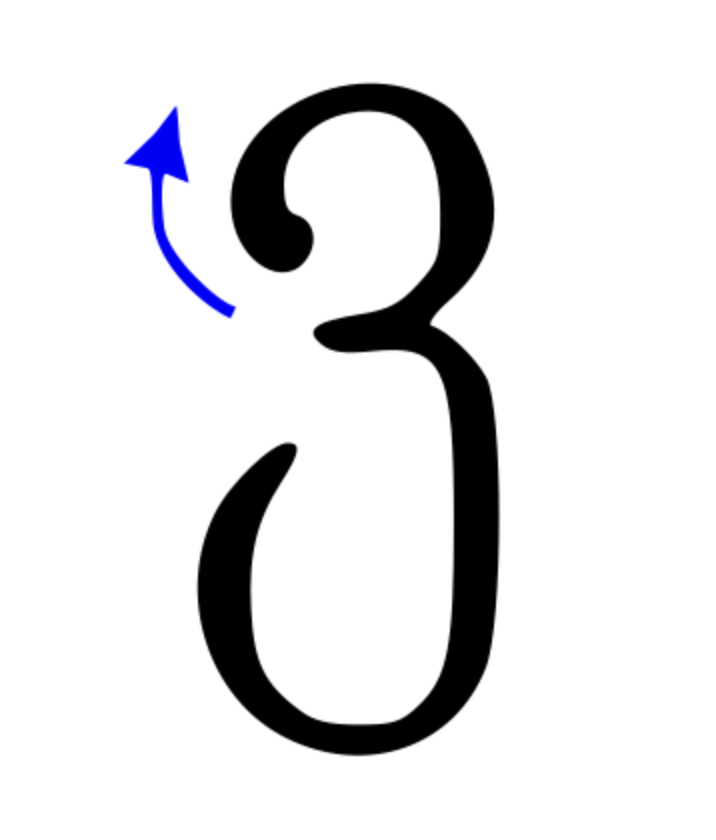
mkhedruli

== Computer encodings ==
Character information
| Preview | Ⴅ | | ⴅ | | ვ | | Ვ | |
|---|---|---|---|---|---|---|---|---|
| Unicode name | GEORGIAN CAPITAL LETTER VIN | | GEORGIAN SMALL LETTER VIN | | GEORGIAN LETTER VIN | | GEORGIAN MTAVRULI CAPITAL LETTER VIN | |
| Encodings | decimal | hex | dec | hex | dec | hex | dec | hex |
| Unicode | 4261 | U+10A5 | 11525 | U+2D05 | 4309 | U+10D5 | 7317 | U+1C95 |
| UTF-8 | 225 130 165 | E1 82 A5 | 226 180 133 | E2 B4 85 | 225 131 149 | E1 83 95 | 225 178 149 | E1 B2 95 |
| Numeric character reference | &#4261; | &#x10A5; | &#11525; | &#x2D05; | &#4309; | &#x10D5; | &#7317; | &#x1C95; |

== Braille ==
mkhedruli

== See also ==
- Latin letter V
- Cyrillic letter Ve

== Bibliography ==
- Mchedlidze, T. (1) The restored Georgian alphabet, Fulda, Germany, 2013
- Mchedlidze, T. (2) The Georgian script; Dictionary and guide, Fulda, Germany, 2013
- Machavariani, E. Georgian manuscripts, Tbilisi, 2011
- The Unicode Standard, Version 6.3, (1) Georgian, 1991-2013
- The Unicode Standard, Version 6.3, (2) Georgian Supplement, 1991-2013
