= Svan language =

Kartvelian language of northwestern Georgia

Svan
- ლუშნუ ნინ Lušnu nin
- Pronunciation: [ˈɫuʃnu nin]
- Native to: Georgia
- Region: Svaneti; Abkhazia
- Native speakers: 14,000 (2015)
- Language family: Kartvelian: Svan
- Writing system: Georgian script

Language codes
- ISO 639-3: sva
- Glottolog: svan1243
- ELP: Svan

- Svan is classified as Definitely Endangered by the UNESCO Atlas of the World's Languages in Danger.

Svan (ლუშნუ ნინ lušnu nin; Georgian: სვანური ენა, romanized: svanuri ena) is a Kartvelian language spoken in the western Georgian region of Svaneti primarily by the Svans, a subgroup of Georgians. It is of particular interest because it has retained many features that have been lost in the other Kartvelian languages.

Historically, Svan has only been a spoken, regional language used informally in day-to-day activities. Svan speakers have traditionally relied on the standard Georgian as their literary language and through the late 19th century there were no known written Svan grammar books or dictionaries. With its speakers variously estimated to be between 30,000 and 80,000, the UNESCO designates Svan as a "definitely endangered language".

== Features ==
=== Familial features ===
Like all languages of the Kartvelian language family, Svan has a large number of consonants. It has agreement between subject and object, and a split-ergative morphosyntactic system. Verbs are marked for aspect, evidentiality and "version".

=== Distinguishing features ===
Svan retains the voiceless aspirated uvular plosive, /qʰ/, and the glides /w/ and /j/. It has a larger vowel inventory than Georgian; the Upper Bal dialect of Svan has the most vowels of any Kartvelian language, having both long and short versions of /a ɛ i ɔ u æ ø y/ plus /ə eː/, a total of 18 vowels (Georgian, by contrast, has just five).

Its morphology is less regular than that of the other three sister languages, and there are notable differences in conjugation.

== Distribution ==
Svan is the native language of fewer than 30,000 Svans (15,000 of whom are Upper Svan dialect speakers and 12,000 are Lower Svan), living in the mountains of Svaneti, i.e. in the districts of Mestia and Lentekhi of Georgia, along the Enguri, Tskhenistsqali and Kodori rivers. Some Svan speakers live in the Kodori Valley of the de facto independent republic of Abkhazia. Although conditions there make it difficult to reliably establish their numbers, there are only an estimated 2,500 Svan individuals living there.

The language is used in familiar and casual social communication. It has no written standard or official status. Most speakers also speak Georgian. The language is considered endangered, as proficiency in it among young people is limited.

== History ==
Svan is the most differentiated member of the four Kartvelian languages and is believed to have split off in the 2nd millennium BC or earlier, about one thousand years before Georgian and Zan split from each other.

Soviet ethnologist Evdokia Kozhevnikova extensively documented the Svan language during her fieldwork in Svaneti in the 1920s and 1930s.

== Dialects ==
The Svan language is divided into the following dialects and subdialects:

- Upper Svan (about 15,000 speakers)
  - Upper Bal: Ushguli, Kala, Ipar, Mulakh, Mestia, Lenzer, Latal.
  - Lower Bal: Becho, Tskhumar, Etser, Par, Chubekh, Lakham.
- Lower Svan (about 12,000 speakers)
  - Lashkhian: Lashkh.
  - Lentekhian: Lentekhi, Kheled, Khopur, Rtskhmelur, Cholur

== Phonology ==
=== Consonants ===
The consonant inventory of Svan is more or less the same as that of Old Georgian. That is, compared to Modern Georgian, it also has /j/, /q/ and /w/, but the labiodental fricative only appears as an allophone of /w/ in the Ln dialect. Furthermore, the uvular consonants /q/ and /q’/ are realized as affricates, i.e. [q͡χ] and [q͡χʼ].

Svan consonants
		Labial	Alveolar	Palatal	Velar	Uvular	Glottal
Nasal		m /m/ მ	n /n/ ნ				
Plosive	voiced	b /b/ ბ	d /d/ დ		g /ɡ/ გ		
Plosive	aspirated	p /pʰ/ ფ	t /tʰ/ თ		k /kʰ/ ქ	q /qʰ/ ჴ	
Plosive	ejective	ṗ /pʼ/ პ	ṭ /tʼ/ ტ		ḳ /kʼ/ კ	q̇ /qʼ/ ყ	ʔ /ʔ/ ჸ
Affricate	voiced		ʒ /d͡z/ ძ	ǯ /d͡ʒ/ ჯ			
Affricate	aspirated		c /t͡sʰ/ ც	č /t͡ʃʰ/ ჩ			
Affricate	ejective		ċ /t͡sʼ/ წ	čʼ /t͡ʃʼ/ ჭ			
Fricative	voiced	(v [v] ვ)	z /z/ ზ	ž /ʒ/ ჟ		ɣ /ʁ/ ღ	
Fricative	voiceless		s /s/ ს	š /ʃ/ შ		x /χ/ ხ	h /h/ ჰ
Approximant		w /w/ უ̂	l /l/ ლ	y /j/ ჲ			
Trill			r /r/ რ				

=== Vowels ===
The vowel inventory of Svan varies between different dialects. For instance, Proto-Svan phonemic long vowels occur in the Upper Bal, Cholur and Lashkh dialects, but have been lost in the Lentekh and Lower Bal dialects. Compared to Georgian, Svan also has a central or back unrounded high vowel /ə/ (realized as [ɯ]~[ɨ]), the low front /æ/ (except for Lashkh) and the front rounded vowels /œ/ and /y/ (also except for Lashkh). The front rounded vowels are often realized as diphthongs [we] and [wi] and are therefore sometimes not treated as separate phonemes.

	Front				Central		Back	
	unrounded		rounded		Central		Back	
	short	long	short	long	short	long	short	long
Close	/i/ ი i	/iː/ ი̄ ī	/y/ უ̈, ჳი ü	/yː/ უ̄̈ ǖ			/u/ უ u	/uː/ უ̄ ū
Close-mid	/e/ ე e	/eː/ ჱ ē			/ə/ (Note: Realized as [ɯ] or [ɨ].) ჷ ə	/əː/ ჷ̄ ə̄		
Open-mid			/œ/ ო̈, ჳე ö	/œː/ ო̄̈ ȫ	/ə/ ჷ ə	/əː/ ჷ̄ ə̄	/ɔ/ ო o	/ɔː/ ო̄ ō
Open	/æ/ ა̈ ä	/æː/ ა̄̈ ǟ					/ɑ/ ა a	/ɑː/ ა̄ ā

=== Alphabet ===
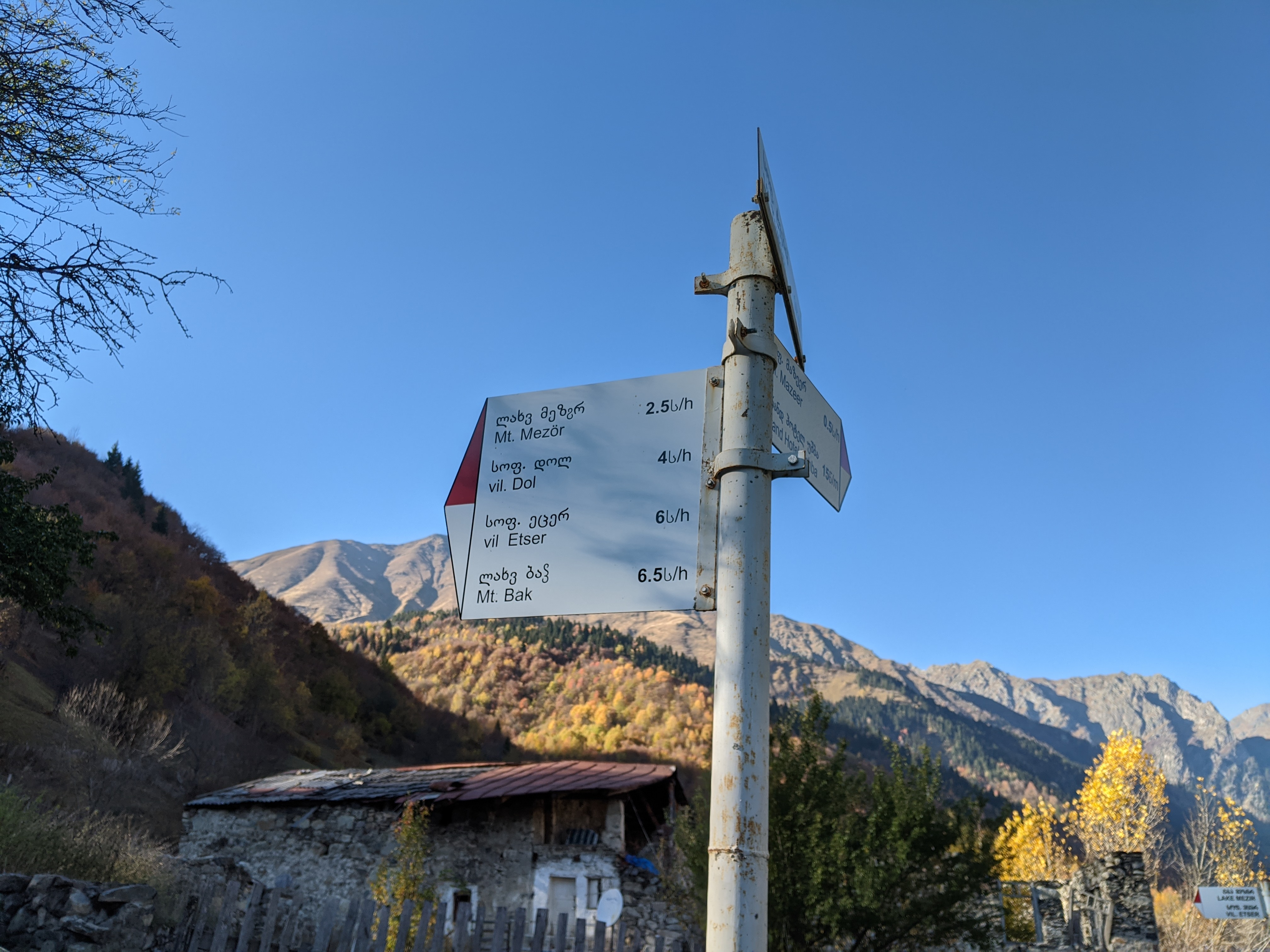
Road sign in Svan language, that contains only Svan-specific letters, and romanized variant

The alphabet, illustrated above, is similar to the Mingrelian alphabet, with a few additional letters otherwise obsolete in the Georgian script:

- ჶ [f]
- ჴ /q⁽ʰ⁾/
- ჸ /ʔ/
- ჲ /j/
- უ̂ /w/
- ჷ /ə/
- ჱ /eː/

These are supplemented by diacritics on the vowels (the umlaut for front vowels and macron for length), though those are not normally written. The digraphs

- ჳი ("wi") /y/
- ჳე ("we") /œ/

are used in the Lower Bal and Lentekh dialects, and occasionally in Upper Bal; these sounds do not occur in Lashkh dialect.
