= Georgian language =

Official language of the country of Georgia

Georgian
- kartuli ena
- ქართული ენა
- Kartuli written in Georgian script
- Pronunciation: [ˈkʰäɾt̪ʰuli ˈe̞n̪ä]
- Native to: Georgia
- Region: South Caucasus
- Ethnicity: Georgians
- speakers: L1: 3.76 million (2020); L2: 150,000 (2014)
- Language family: Kartvelian: Karto-Zan; Old Georgian; Middle Georgian; Georgian
- Dialects: Georgian dialects; Judaeo-Georgian
- Writing system: Georgian script; Georgian Braille

Official status
- Official language in: Georgia
- Regulated by: Government of Georgia

Language codes
- ISO 639-1: ka
- ISO 639-2: geo (B) kat (T)
- ISO 639-3: kat
- Glottolog: nucl1302
- Linguasphere: 42-CAB-baa

A sample of spoken Georgian.

Georgian (ქართული ენა, kartuli ena, [ˈkʰäɾt̪ʰuli ˈe̞n̪ä]) is the most widely spoken Kartvelian language. It is the official language of Georgia and the native or primary language of 88% of its population. It also serves as the literary language or lingua franca for speakers of related languages. Its speakers number approximately 3.8 million. Georgian is written with its own unique Georgian scripts, alphabetical systems of unclear origin.

Georgian is not related to any of the world's major language families found outside of Georgia. It is most closely connected to other regional languages of Georgia, such as Mingrelian and, more distantly, Svan. Georgian has various dialects, with standard Georgian based on the Kartlian dialect, and all dialects are mutually intelligible. The history of Georgian spans from Early Old Georgian in the 5th century, to Modern Georgian. Its development as a written language began with the Christianization of Georgia in the 4th century.

Georgian phonology features a rich consonant system, including aspirated, voiced, and ejective stops, affricates, and fricatives. Its vowel system consists of five vowels with varying realizations. Georgian prosody involves weak stress, with disagreements among linguists on its placement. The language's phonotactics include complex consonant clusters and harmonic clusters. The Mkhedruli script, dominant in modern usage, corresponds closely to Georgian phonemes and has no case distinction, though it employs a capital-like effect called Mtavruli for titles and inscriptions. Georgian is an agglutinative language with a complex verb structure that can include up to eight morphemes, exhibiting polypersonalism. The language has seven noun cases and employs a left-branching structure with adjectives preceding nouns and postpositions instead of prepositions. Georgian lacks grammatical gender and articles, with definite meanings established through context. Georgian's rich derivation system allows for extensive noun and verb formation from roots, with many words featuring initial consonant clusters.

The Georgian writing system has evolved from ancient scripts into Mkhedruli, used for most purposes. The language has a robust grammatical framework with distinctive features such as syncope in morphophonology and a left-branching syntax. Georgian's vocabulary is highly derivational, allowing for diverse word formations, while its numeric system is vigesimal, based on 20, as opposed to a base 10 (decimal) system.

== Classification ==
No claimed genetic links between the Kartvelian languages and any other language family in the world are accepted in mainstream linguistics. Among the Kartvelian languages, Georgian is most closely related to the so-called Zan languages (Mingrelian and Laz); glottochronological studies indicate that it split from the latter approximately 2,700 years ago. Svan is a more distant relative that split off much earlier, perhaps 4,000 years ago.

== Dialects ==
The Georgian language has at least 18 dialects, with Standard Georgian being largely based on the Kartlian dialect. Over the centuries, it has exerted a strong influence on the other dialects. As a result, they are all, generally, mutually intelligible with standard Georgian, and with one another.

== History ==
The history of the Georgian language is conventionally divided into the following phases:

- Early Old Georgian: 5th–8th centuries
- Classical Old Georgian: 9th–11th centuries
- Middle Georgian: 11th/12th–17th/18th centuries
- Modern Georgian: 17th/18th century–present

The earliest extant references to Georgian are found in the writings of Marcus Cornelius Fronto, a Roman grammarian from the 2nd century AD. The first direct attestations of the language are inscriptions and palimpsests dating to the 5th century, and the oldest surviving literary work is the 5th-century Martyrdom of the Holy Queen Shushanik by Iakob Tsurtaveli.

The emergence of Georgian as a written language appears to have been the result of the Christianization of the Kingdom of Iberia in the mid-4th century, which led to the replacement of Aramaic as the literary language.

By the 11th century, Old Georgian had developed into Middle Georgian. The most famous work of this period is the epic poem The Knight in the Panther's Skin, written by Shota Rustaveli in the 12th century.

In 1629, Nikoloz Cholokashvili authored the first printed books written (partially) in Georgian, the Alphabetum Ibericum sive Georgianum cum Oratione and the Dittionario giorgiano e italiano. These were meant to help western Catholic missionaries learn Georgian for evangelical purposes.

== Phonology ==
=== Consonants ===
Georgian has a large consonant inventory, like most languages of the Caucasus. It contrasts fully voiced, aspirated and ejective stops and affricates. Fricatives occur in five places of articulation (six if the uvular [χʼ] as an allophone of /qʼ/ is counted), with voicing contrast for denti-alveolar (/s z/), post-alveolar (/ʃ ʒ/) and velar fricatives (/x ɣ/). Notably missing as a phoneme is the voiceless labio-dental, namely /f/, to contrast with /v/. The glottal fricative /h/ is marginal, occurring in very few words in the modern language.

The table below contains consonant phonemes in Georgian. On the left are IPA symbols, and on the right are the corresponding letters of the modern Georgian alphabet.

Consonants
		Labial	Dental/ Alveolar	Post-alveolar	Velar	Uvular	Glottal
Nasal		m მ	n ნ				
Stop	aspirated	pʰ ფ	tʰ თ		kʰ ქ		
Stop	voiced	b ბ^{7, 8, 10}	d დ^{7, 8, 10}		ɡ გ^{7, 8, 10}		
Stop	ejective	pʼ პ	tʼ ტ		kʼ კ	qʼ^{3} ყ	
Affricate	(aspirated)		t͡sʰ^{1} ც	t͡ʃʰ^{1} ჩ			
Affricate	voiced		d͡z ძ	d͡ʒ ჯ			
Affricate	ejective		t͡sʼ წ	t͡ʃʼ ჭ			
Fricative	voiceless		s ს	ʃ შ	x ^{2} ხ		h ჰ
Fricative	voiced	ʋ ვ^{6}	z ზ	ʒ ჟ	ɣ ^{2} ღ		
Vibrant			r რ^{4,9}				
Lateral			l ლ^{5}				

1. Opinions differ on the aspiration of /t͡sʰ, t͡ʃʰ/.
2. Opinions differ on how to classify /x/ and /ɣ/; Aronson (1990) classifies them as post-velar, Hewitt (1995) argues that they range from velar to uvular /χ ʁ/ according to context.
3. The uvular ejective stop is commonly realized as a uvular ejective fricative [χʼ] but it can also be [qʼ], [ʔ], or [qχʼ]; they are in free variation.
4. /r/ is realized as an alveolar tap [ɾ] though [r] occurs in free variation.
5. /l/ is pronounced as a velarized [ɫ] before back vowels; it is pronounced as [l] in the environment of front vowels.
6. /v/ is realized in most contexts as a bilabial fricative [β] or [v], but has the following allophones.
  1. before voiceless consonants, it is realized as [f] or [ɸ].
  2. after voiceless consonants it is also voiceless and has been interpreted either as labialization of the preceding consonant [ʷ] or simply as [ɸ].
  3. whether it is realized as labialization after voiced consonants is debated.
  4. word-initially before the vowel /u/ and sometimes before other consonants it may be deleted entirely.
7. In initial positions, /b, d, ɡ/ are pronounced as a weakly voiced [b̥, d̥, ɡ̊].
8. In word-final positions, /b, d, ɡ/ may be devoiced and aspirated to [pʰ, tʰ, kʰ].
9. /r/ may be dropped in CrC contexts in colloquial speech.
10. Word-final /b, d, ɡ/ may be realized as unreleased stops [b̚, d̚, ɡ̚] before another obstruent at word boundaries.

Old Georgian uvular /qʰ/ (ჴ) has merged with velar /x/ (ხ) in the modern language as /x/.

The coronal occlusives (/tʰ tʼ d n/, not necessarily affricates) are variously described as apical dental, laminal alveolar, and "dental".

==== Ejectives and glottalization ====
The glottalization of Georgian ejectives is phonetically subtle. A study of the properties of Georgian stops and ejectives found that bursts in ejective consonants are virtually identical to those of pulmonic stops, with voice onset time and voicing perhaps being more relevant as cues to the different consonant types than a stronger "popping" sound associated with stop burst releases.

Vicenik also observed that Georgian vowels following ejective stops have creaky voice and suggests this may be one other perceptual cue distinguishing ejectives from their aspirated and voiced counterparts.

=== Vowels ===
Vowel phonemes
	Front	Central	Back
Close	i ი		u უ
Mid	e ე		o ო
Open		a ა	

Per Canepari, the main realizations of the vowels are [i], [e̞], [ä], [o̞], [u].

Aronson describes their realizations as [i̞], [e̞], [ä] (but "slightly fronted"), [o̞], [u̞].

Shosted transcribed one speaker's pronunciation more-or-less consistently with [i], [ɛ], [ɑ], [ɔ], [u].

Allophonically, [ə] may be inserted to break up consonant clusters, as in /dɡas/ [dəɡäs].

In casual speech, /i/ preceded or followed by a vowel may be realized as [i̯]~[j]. similarly, /u/ and /o/ before a vowel may be realized as [w].

Phrase-final unstressed vowels are sometimes partially reduced.

Sequences /aa ii ee oo uu/ occurring at word and morpheme boundaries may be realized as single long vowels [äː iː e̞ː o̞ː uː], as in /kʼibeebi/ [ˈkʼibe̞ːbi] ("stairs").

=== Phonotactics ===
Georgian syllable structure is notable due to its frequent consonant clusters, many of which fail to conform to the sonority sequencing principle. Clusters are especially common in onset position, where three-consonant sequences often occur even in basic vocabulary. In coda position, sequences of more than two are much rarer, especially word-finally. Clusters of two or more consonants often contain morphemes such as in inflected verbs (e.g. /t͡sʼeɾt/ 'you write') or declined nominals (e.g. /datvs/ 'bear.dative').

==== Harmonic clusters ====
One special characteristic of Georgian phonotactics is the occurrence of two-consonant sequences termed harmonic clusters, which involve two consonants in which the laryngeal quality is constant across the cluster (i.e. both are voiced, aspirated, or ejective). Harmonic clusters are pronounced with individual releases of each segment, and occur both word-initially and word-medially; e.g. /bgeɾa/ ბგერა 'sound', /t͡sʰxovɾeba/ ცხოვრება 'life', or /apʼkʼi/ აპკი 'membrane'.

The first consonant of a harmonic cluster may be a stop or an affricate, whereas the second segment may be either a velar stop or a velar/uvular fricative. All harmonic clusters are sequences of a front and a back consonant. Harmonic clusters may themselves occur in larger clusters of consonants, such as in three-consonant sequence /tʼkʼbili/ ტᲙბილი 'sweet'.

Georgian harmonic clusters
C_{1}C_{2} Manner	C_{1}C_{2} Place	Cluster Phonation		
C_{1}C_{2} Manner	C_{1}C_{2} Place	Voiced	Aspirated	Ejective
Stop-Stop	Labio-Velar	/bɡeɾa/ ბგერა	/pʰkʰʷili/ ფქვილი	/pʼkʼuɾeba/ პკურება
Stop-Stop	Corono-Velar	/dɡoma/ დგომა	/tʰkʰeʃi/ თქეში	/tʼkʼbili/ ტკბილი
Affricate-Stop	Alveolar-Velar	/d͡zɡide/ ძგიდე	/t͡sʰkʰeɾa/ ცქერა	/t͡sʼkʼmutʼuni/ წკმუტუნი
Affricate-Stop	Post-alveolar-Velar	/d͡ʒɡupʰi/ ჯგუფი	/t͡ʃʰkʰaɾa/ ჩქარა	/t͡ʃʼkʼʷiani/ ჭკვიანი
Stop-Fricative	Labio-Velar/Uvular	/bɣud͡ʒa/ ბღუჯა	/pʰxizeli/ ფხიზელი	/pʼχʼrobi/ პყრობი
Stop-Fricative	Corono-Velar/Uvular	/dɣʷena/ დღვენა	/tʰxili/ თხილი	/tʼχʼuili/ ტყუილი

==== Non-harmonic and longer consonant clusters with audio examples ====
Recordings are available on the relevant Wiktionary entries, linked to below.

- Examples of words that begin with two consonants in non-harmonic clusters (note that affricates /t͡s d͡z t͡sʼ/ etc. behave as one segment) :
  - /t͡sʼqʼali/ წყალი (ts’q’ali), 'water'
  - /st͡sʼori/ სწორი (sts’ori), 'correct'
  - /rd͡ze/ რძე (rdze), 'milk'
  - /tʰma/ თმა (tma), 'hair'
  - /mtʰa/ მთა (mta), 'mountain'
  - /t͡sʰxeni/ ცხენი (tskheni), 'horse'
- Examples of the many words that begin with three contiguous consonants:
  - /tʰkʰven/ თქვენ (tkven), 'you (pl.)'
  - /mt͡sʼvane/ მწვანე (mts’vane), 'green'
  - /t͡sʰxviɾi/ ცხვირი (tskhviri), 'nose'
  - /t’k’bili/ ტკბილი (t’k’bili), 'sweet'
  - /mt’k’ivneuli/ მტკივნეული (mt’k’ivneuli), 'painful'
  - /t͡ʃʰɾdiloetʰi/ ჩრდილოეთი (chrdiloeti), 'north'
- A few words in Georgian that begin with four contiguous consonants. Examples are:
  - მკვლელი (mk’vleli), 'murderer'
  - მკვდარი (mk’vdari), 'dead'
  - მთვრალი (mtvrali), 'drunk'
  - მწკრივი (mts’k’rivi), 'row, screeve'
- Some extreme cases also exist in Georgian. For example, the following word begins with six contiguous consonants:
  - მწვრთნელი (mts’vrtneli), 'trainer'
- While the following word begins with seven:
  - გვწვრთნი (gvts’vrtni), 'you train us'
- And the following words begin with eight:
  - გვფრცქვნი (gvprtskvni), 'you peel us'
  - გვბრდღვნი (gvbrdghvni), 'you tear us'

=== Prosody ===
Although the first syllable of Georgian words tends to be prominent, there is disagreement as to whether Georgian has lexical stress. In any case, there are no pairs of words in Georgian that contrast in meaning due to stress placement

According to a study by Borise and Zientarski, Georgian has fixed initial word-level stress cued primarily by greater syllable duration and intensity of the initial syllable of a word. Georgian vowels in non-initial syllables are pronounced with a shorter duration compared to vowels in initial syllables. Long polysyllabic words may have a secondary stress on their third or fourth syllable. A study by Gamq'relidze and colleagues states that quadrisyllabic words may be exceptionally stressed on their second syllable. Stressed vowels in Georgian have slightly longer duration, more intensity, and higher pitch compared to unstressed vowels.

Other authors have proposed that Georgian is an edge-prominence language, meaning that prominence and pitch accents mark accentual phrases rather than words. According to Vicenik and Jun, Georgian words receive pitch accents in syllables other than the first.

== Writing system ==
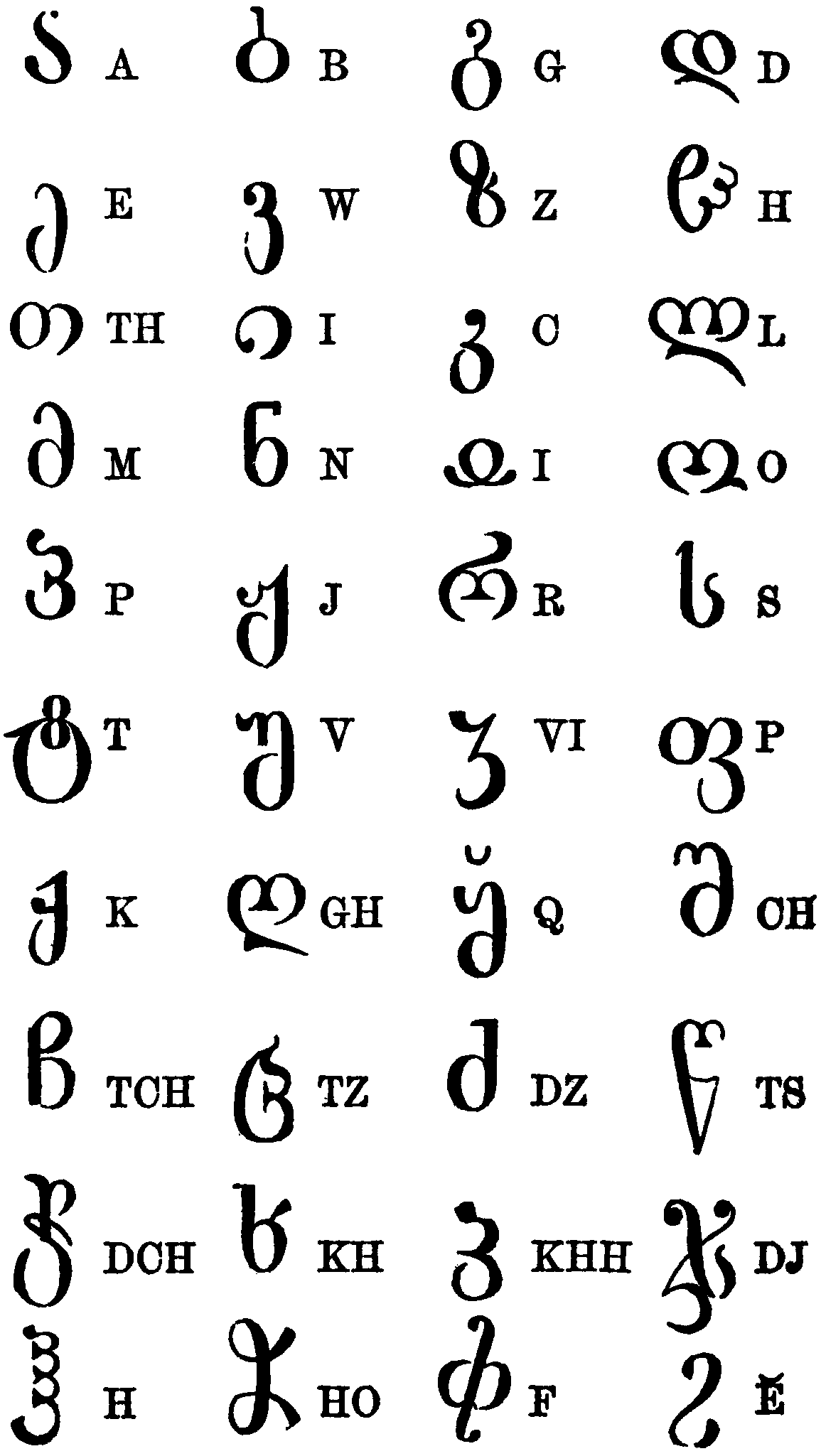
Georgian alphabet from The American Cyclopædia, 1879

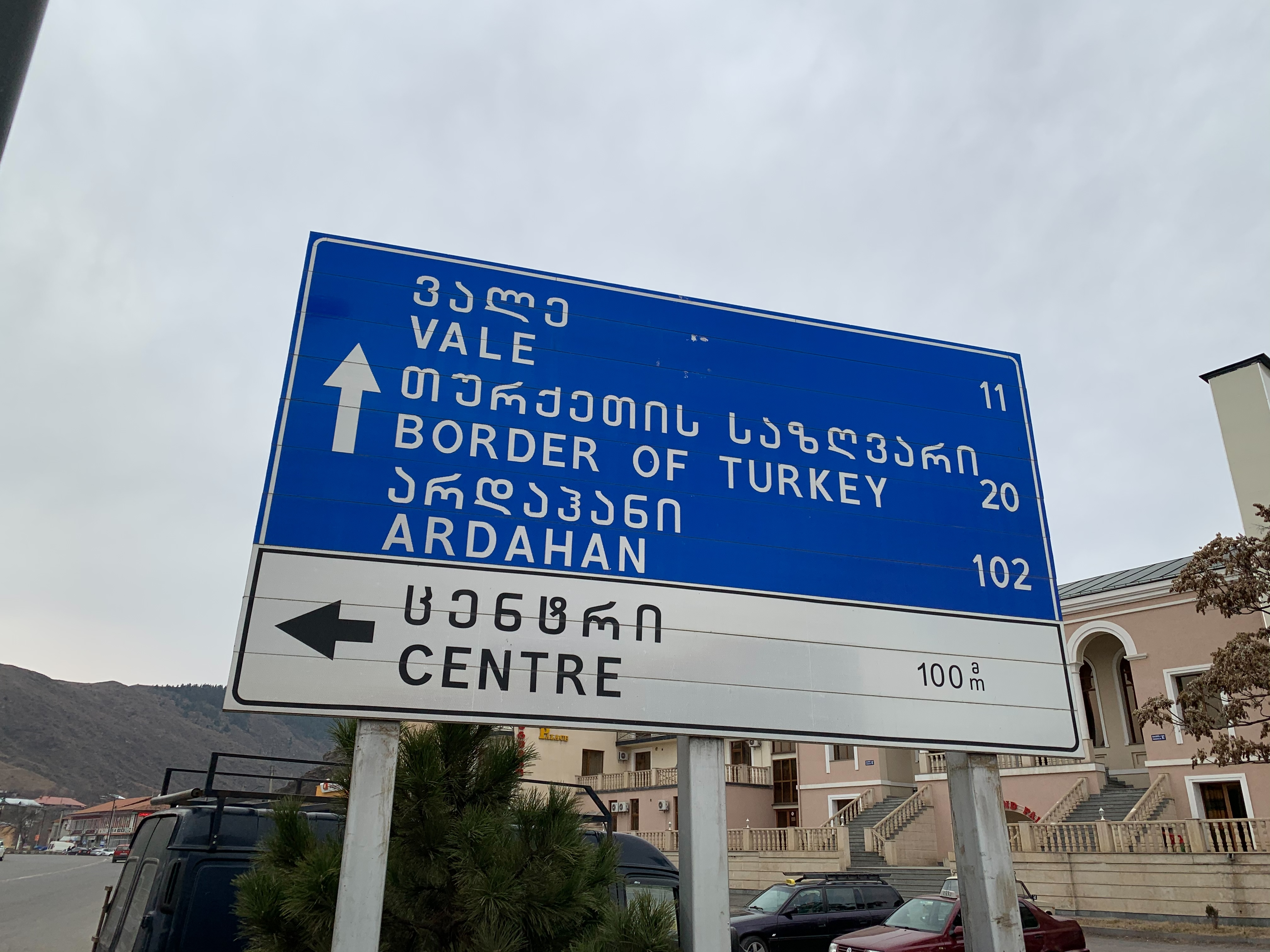
Road sign in Mtavruli and Latin scripts

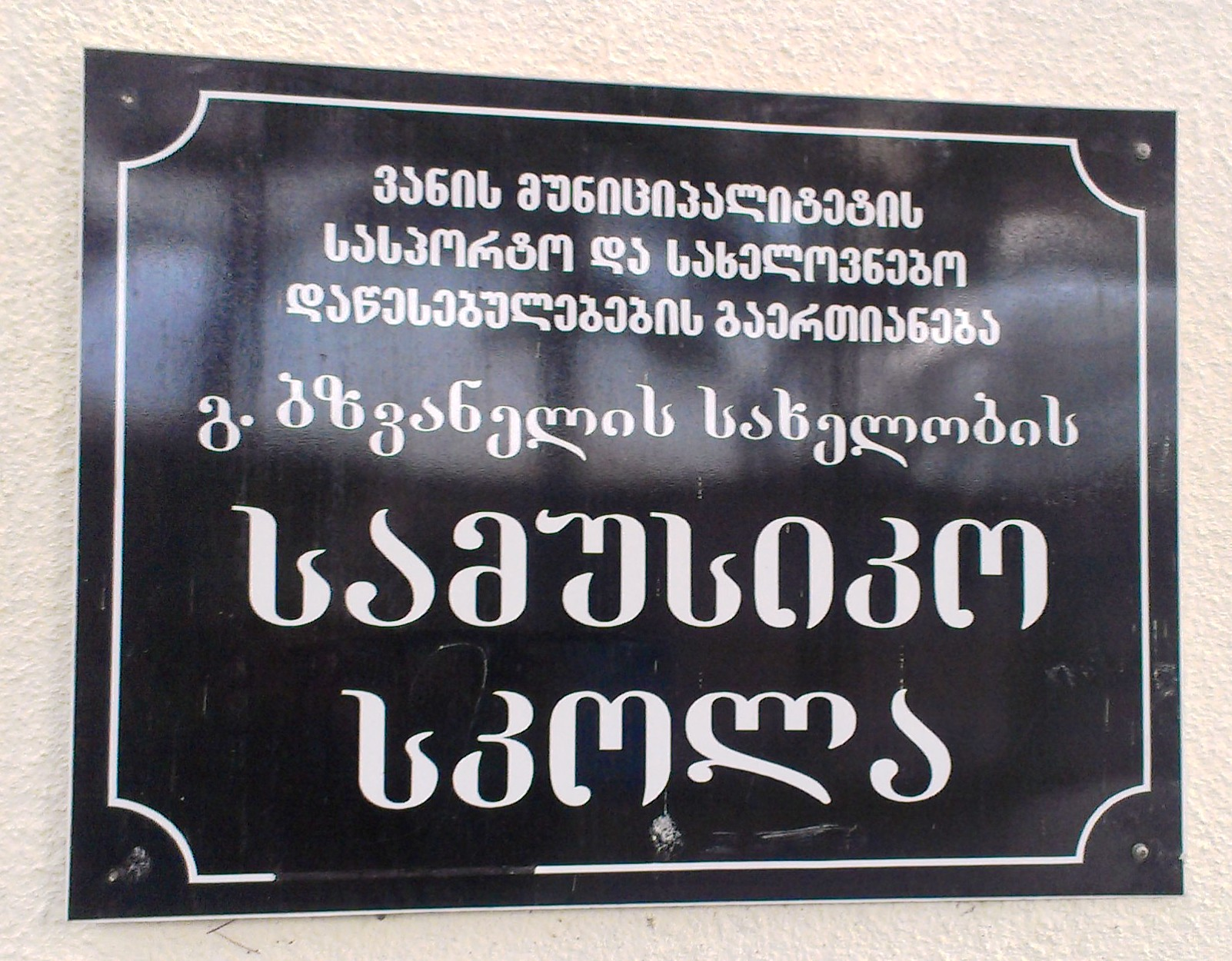
A music school sign using a sans-serif Mtavruli script in the upper part, a serif Mkhedruli script in the middle and a serif Mtavruli script in the lower part

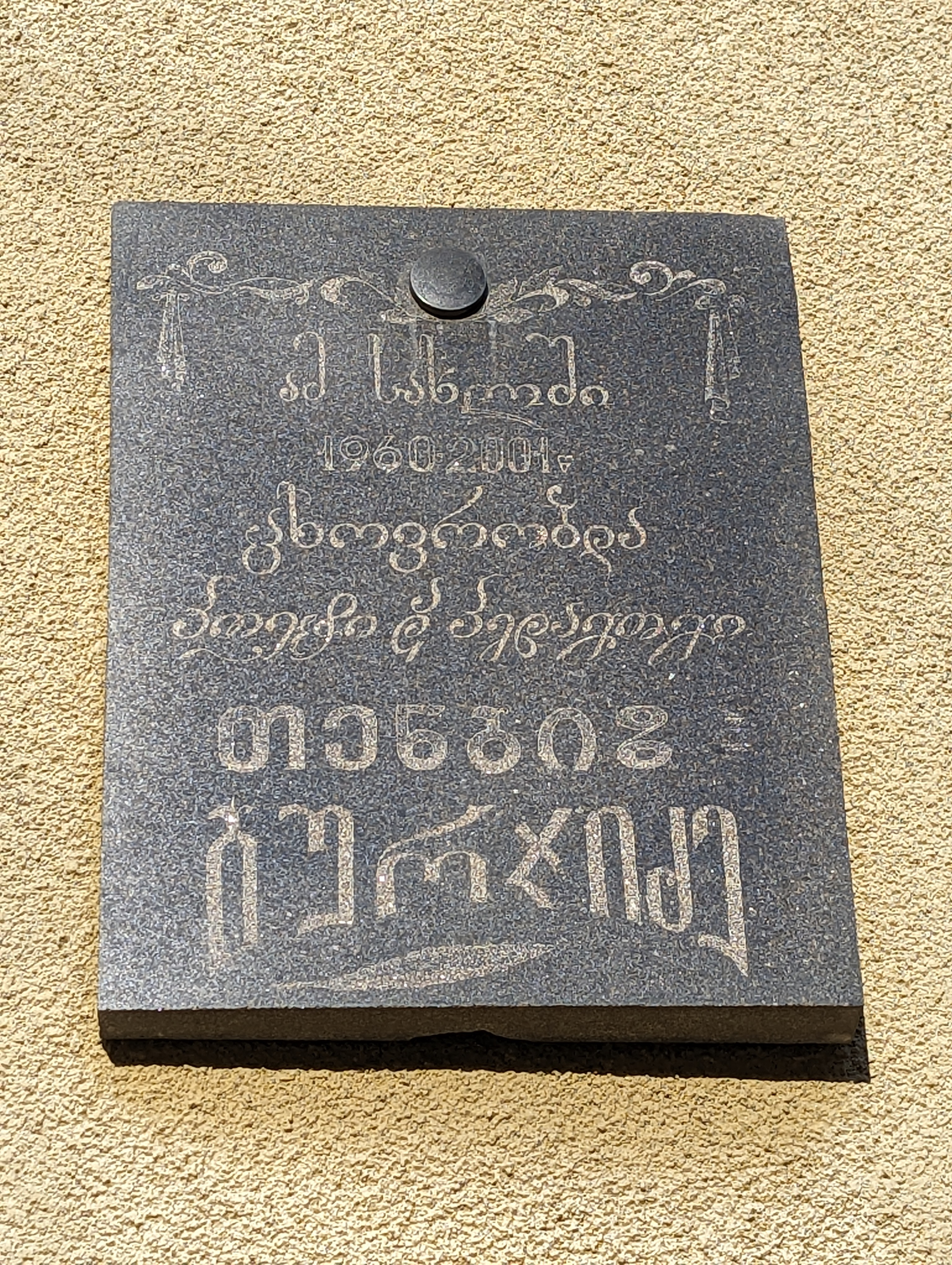
A commemorative plaque using Mkhedruli for the upper four lines and Mtavruli for the lower two (the name of the person), with each line written in a different typeface

Georgian has been written in a variety of scripts over its history. Currently the Mkhedruli script is almost completely dominant; the others are used mostly in religious documents and architecture.

Mkhedruli has 33 letters in common use; a half dozen more are obsolete in Georgian, though still used in other alphabets, like Mingrelian, Laz, and Svan. The letters of Mkhedruli correspond closely to the phonemes of the Georgian language.

According to the traditional account written down by Leonti Mroveli in the 11th century, the first Georgian script was created by the first ruler of the Kingdom of Iberia, Pharnavaz, in the 3rd century BC. The first examples of a Georgian script date from the 5th century AD. There are now three Georgian scripts, called Asomtavruli 'capitals', Nuskhuri 'small letters', and Mkhedruli. The first two are used together as upper and lower case in the writings of the Georgian Orthodox Church and together are called Khutsuri 'priest alphabet'.

In Mkhedruli, there is no case. Sometimes, however, a capital-like effect, called Mtavruli ('title' or 'heading'), is achieved by modifying the letters so that their vertical sizes are identical and they rest on the baseline with no descenders. These capital-like letters are often used in page headings, chapter titles, monumental inscriptions, and the like.

Modern Georgian alphabet
Letter	National transcription	IPA transcription
ა	a	[ä]
ბ	b	[b]
გ	g	[ɡ]
დ	d	[d]
ე	e	[e̞]
ვ	v	[v~w]
ზ	z	[z]
თ	t	[tʰ]
ი	i	[i]
კ	k’	[kʼ]
ლ	l	[l]
მ	m	[m]
ნ	n	[n]
ო	o	[o̞]
პ	p’	[pʼ]
ჟ	zh	[ʒ]
რ	r	[r]
ს	s	[s]
ტ	t’	[tʼ]
უ	u	[u]
ფ	p	[pʰ]
ქ	k	[kʰ]
ღ	gh	[ɣ]
ყ	q’	[qʼ]
შ	sh	[ʃ]
ჩ	ch	[t͡ʃʰ]
ც	ts	[t͡sʰ]
ძ	dz	[d͡z]
წ	ts’	[t͡sʼ]
ჭ	ch’	[t͡ʃʼ]
ხ	kh	[x]
ჯ	j	[d͡ʒ]
ჰ	h	[h]
ჶ	f (in loans)	[f]

=== Keyboard layout ===
This is the Georgian standard keyboard layout. The standard Windows keyboard is essentially that of manual typewriters.

“ „	1 !	2 ?	3 №	4 §	5 %	6 :	7.	8;	9,	0 /	- _	+ =	←^{Backspace}

_{Tab key}	ღ	ჯ	უ	კ	ე ჱ	ნ	გ	შ	წ	ზ	ხ ჴ	ც	) (

_{Caps lock}	ფ ჶ	ძ	ვ ჳ	თ	ა	პ	რ	ო	ლ	დ	ჟ	_{Enter key} ↵

_{Shift key} ↑	ჭ	ჩ	ყ	ს	მ	ი ჲ	ტ	ქ	ბ	ჰ ჵ	_{Shift key} ↑

_{Control key}	_{Win key}	_{Alt key}	_{Space bar}	_{AltGr key}	_{Win key}	_{Menu key}	_{Control key}

== Grammar ==
=== Morphology ===
Georgian is an agglutinative language. Certain prefixes and suffixes can be joined in order to build a verb. In some cases, one verb can have up to eight different morphemes in it at the same time. An example is ageshenebinat ('you [all] should've built [it]'). The verb can be broken down to parts: a-g-e-shen-eb-in-a-t. Each morpheme here contributes to the meaning of the verb tense or the person who has performed the verb. The verb conjugation also exhibits polypersonalism; a verb may potentially include morphemes representing both the subject and the object.

==== Morphophonology ====
In Georgian morphophonology, syncope is a common phenomenon. When a suffix (especially the plural suffix -eb-) is attached to a word that has either of the vowels a or e in the last syllable, this vowel is, in most words, lost. For example, megobari means 'friend'; megobrebi (megobØrebi) means 'friends', with the loss of a in the last syllable of the word stem.

==== Inflection ====
Georgian has seven noun cases: nominative, ergative, dative, genitive, instrumental, adverbial and vocative. An interesting feature of Georgian is that, while the subject of a sentence is generally in the nominative case and the object is in the accusative case (or dative), one can find this reversed in many situations (this depends mainly on the character of the verb). This is called the dative construction. In the past tense of the transitive verbs, and in the present tense of the verb "to know", the subject is in the ergative case.

=== Syntax ===
- Georgian is a left-branching language, in which adjectives precede nouns, possessors precede possessions, objects normally precede verbs, and postpositions are used instead of prepositions.
- Each postposition (whether a suffix or a separate word) requires the modified noun to be in a specific case. This is similar to the way prepositions govern specific cases in many Indo-European languages such as German, Latin, or Russian.
- Georgian is a pro-drop language; both subject and object pronouns are frequently omitted except for emphasis or to resolve ambiguity.
- A study by Skopeteas et al. concluded that Georgian word order tends to place the focus of a sentence immediately before the verb, and the topic before the focus. A subject–object–verb (SOV) word order is common in idiomatic expressions and when the focus of a sentence is on the object. A subject–verb–object (SVO) word order is common when the focus is on the subject, or in longer sentences. Object-initial word orders (OSV or OVS) are also possible, but less common. Verb-initial word orders including both subject and object (VSO or VOS) are extremely rare.
- Georgian has no grammatical gender; even the pronouns are ungendered.
- Georgian has no articles. Therefore, for example, "guest", "a guest" and "the guest" are said in the same way. In relative clauses, however, it is possible to establish the meaning of the definite article through use of some particles.

== Vocabulary ==
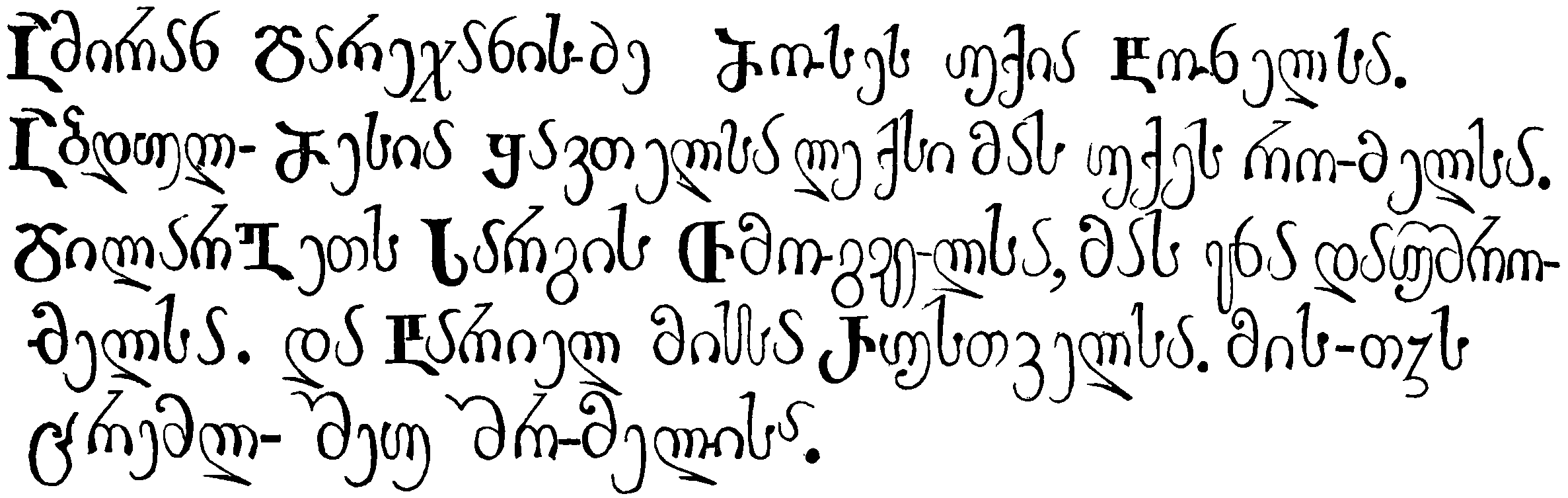
The last verse of Shota Rustaveli's romance The Knight in the Panther's Skin illustrating the appearance of the Georgian script

Georgian has a rich word-derivation system. By using a root, and adding some definite prefixes and suffixes, one can derive many nouns and adjectives from the root. For example, from the root -kart-, the following words can be derived: Kartveli ('a Georgian person'), Kartuli ('the Georgian language') and Sakartvelo ('the country of Georgia').

Most Georgian surnames end in -dze 'son' (Western Georgia), -shvili 'child' (Eastern Georgia), -ia (Western Georgia, Samegrelo), -ani (Western Georgia, Svaneti), -uri (Eastern Georgia), etc. The ending -eli is a particle of nobility, comparable to French de, German von or Polish -ski.

Georgian has a vigesimal numeric system like Basque and (partially) French. Numbers greater than 20 and less than 100 are described as the sum of the greatest possible multiple of 20 plus the remainder. For example, "93" literally translates as 'four times twenty plus thirteen' (ოთხმოცდაცამეტი, otkhmotsdatsamet’i).

One of the most important Georgian dictionaries is the Explanatory dictionary of the Georgian language (ქართული ენის განმარტებითი ლექსიკონი). It consists of eight volumes and about 115,000 words. It was produced between 1950 and 1964, by a team of linguists under the direction of Arnold Chikobava.

== Examples ==
=== Word formation ===
Georgian has a rich derivation system in which both prefixes and suffixes are used to create new words, for example:

- From the root -ts’er- 'write', the words ts’erili 'letter' and mts’erali 'writer' are derived.
- From the root -tsa- 'give', the word gadatsema 'broadcast' is derived.
- From the root -tsda- 'try', the word gamotsda 'exam' is derived.
- From the root -gav- 'resemble', the words msgavsi 'similar' and msgavseba 'similarity' are derived.
- From the root -shen- 'build', the word shenoba 'building' is derived.
- From the root -tskh- 'bake', the word namtskhvari 'cake' is derived.
- From the root -tsiv- 'cold', the word matsivari 'refrigerator' is derived.
- From the root -pr- 'fly', the words tvitmprinavi 'airplane' and aprena 'takeoff' are derived.

It is also possible to derive verbs from nouns:

- From the noun -omi- 'war', the verb omob 'you wage/are waging war' is derived.
- From the noun -sadili- 'lunch', the verb sadilob 'you eat/are eating lunch' is derived.
- From the noun -sauzme 'breakfast', the verb ts’asauzmeba 'eating a little breakfast' is derived; the preverb ts’a- in Georgian adds the meaning 'a little'.
- From the noun -sakhli- 'home', the verb gadasakhleba 'relocating, moving' is derived.

Likewise, verbs can be derived from adjectives, for example:

- From the adjective -ts’iteli- 'red', the verb gats’itleba 'blushing, making one blush' is derived. This kind of derivation can be done with many adjectives in Georgian.
- From the adjective -brma 'blind', the verbs dabrmaveba 'becoming blind, blinding someone' are derived.
- From the adjective -lamazi- 'beautiful', the verb galamazeba 'becoming beautiful' is derived.

== Sample text ==
Recording of a middle-aged male speaker reading Article 1.

Article 1 of the Universal Declaration of Human Rights:

Georgian alphabet	Latin alphabet	International Phonetic Alphabet	English translation
ყველა ადამიანი იბადება თავისუფალი და თანასწორი თავისი ღირსებითა და უფლებებით. მათ მინიჭებული აქვთ გონება და სინდისი და ერთმანეთის მიმართ უნდა იქცეოდნენ ძმობის სულისკვეთებით.	Qvela adamiani ibadeba tavisupali da tanasc’ori tavisi ghirsebita da uplebebit. Mat minich’ebuli akvt goneba da sindisi da ertmanetis mimart unda iktseodnen dzmobis sulisk’vetebit.	[qʼʷe̞ɫä‿ädämiäni‿ibäde̞bä tʰäβisupʰäli d̥ä tʰänäst͡sʼo̞ɾi tʰäβisi ʁiɾse̞bitʰä d̥ä‿upʰle̞be̞bitʰ ‖ mätʰ minit͡ʃ’e̞buli‿äkʰʷtʰ ɡ̊o̞ne̞bä d̥ä sindisi d̥ä‿e̞ɾtʰmäne̞tʰis mimäɾtʰ undä‿ikʰt͡sʰe̞o̞dne̞n d͡zmo̞bis sulisk’ʷe̞tʰe̞bitʰ ‖]	All human beings are born free and equal in dignity and rights. They are endowed with reason and conscience and should act towards one another in a spirit of brotherhood.

== See also ==
- Georgian dialects
- Georgian calligraphy
- Georgian calendar
- Georgian grammar
- Georgian numerals
- Georgian profanity

== Bibliography ==
- Abuladze, Lia; Ludden, Andreas (2011). Lehrbuch der georgischen Sprache (in German) (2nd ed.). Hamburg: Buske. ISBN 978-3-87548-620-9.
- Aleksidze, Zaza (1968). Epistoleta Tsigni (in Georgian). Tbilisi. p. 150.
- Aronson, Howard I. (1990). Georgian: A Reading Grammar (2nd ed.). Columbus, OH: Slavica.
- Butskhrikidze, Marika (2002). "The consonant phonotactics of Georgian". The consonant phonotactics of Georgian.
- Canepari, Luciano (2007). Natural Phonetics and Tonetics: Articulatory, Auditory, & Functional. München: Lincom Europa.
- Dalby, A. (2002). Language in Danger; The Loss of Linguistic Diversity and the Threat to Our Future. Columbia University Press. ISBN 9780231129008.
- Fähnrich, Heinz (2013). Die ältesten georgischen Inschriften [The oldest Georgian inscriptions] (in German). Leiden: Brill. ISBN 978-90-04-24921-9.
- Delshad, Farshid (2010). Georgica et Irano-Semitica: Studies on Iranian, Semitic and Georgian Linguistics (in German, English, Russian, and Georgian). Wiesbaden.
- Hewitt, Brian G. (1987). The Typology of Subordination in Georgian and Abkhaz. Berlin: De Gruyter.
- Hewitt, B. G. (1995). Georgian: A Structural Reference Grammar. Amsterdam: John Benjamins.
- Hewitt, B. G. (1996). Georgian: A Learner's Grammar. London: Routledge.
- Hiller, P. J. (1994). Georgian: The Kartvelian Literary Language. Pontypridd, Wales: Language Information Centre.
- Ingorokva, Pavle (1941). "Georgian inscriptions of antique". Bulletin of ENIMK (in Georgian). X. Tbilisi: 411–427.
- Javakhishvili, Ivane (1949). Georgian Paleography (in Georgian). Tbilisi. p. 500.
- Jun, Sun-Ah; Vicenik, Chad; Lofstedt, Ingvar (2007). "Intonational Phonology of Georgian" (PDF). UCLA Working Papers in Phonetics (106): 41–57. Archived from the original (PDF) on 16 June 2012.
- Kiziria, Dodona (2009). Beginner's Georgian with 2 Audio CDs. New York: Hippocrene. ISBN 978-0-7818-1230-6.
- Danelia, Korneli; Sarjveladze, Zurab (1997). Questions of Georgian Paleography (in Georgian). Tbilisi. p. 150.
- Kraveishvili, M.; Nakhutsrishvili, G. (1972). Teach Yourself Georgian for English Speaking Georgians. Tbilisi: The Georgian Society for Cultural Relations with Compatriots Abroad.
- Machavariani, Elene (1982). The Graphical Basis of the Georgian Alphabet (in Georgian). Tbilisi. p. 107.
- Price, Glanville (1998). An Encyclopedia of the Languages of Europe. Blackwell.
- Putkaradze, Tariel; Mikautadze, Maia (2014). Phonetics of the Georgian Literary Language. Tbilisi.
- Pataridze, Ramaz (1980). The Georgian Asomtavruli (in Georgian). Tbilisi. p. 600.
- Shosted, Ryan K.; Chikovani, Vakhtang (2006). "Standard Georgian" (PDF). Journal of the International Phonetic Association. 36 (2): 255–264. doi:10.1017/S0025100306002659. S2CID 53481687.
- Skopeteas, Stavros; Féry, Caroline; Asatiani, Rusudan (2009). Word Order and Intonation in Georgian. University of Potsdam.
- Testelets, Yakov G. (2020). "Kartvelian (South Caucasian) Languages". In Polinsky, Maria (ed.). The Oxford Handbook of Languages of the Caucasus. pp. 491–528.
- Vicenik, Chad (2010). "An acoustic study of Georgian stop consonants". Journal of the International Phonetic Association. 40 (1): 59–92. doi:10.1017/S0025100309990302. S2CID 143120834.
