= Ligature (writing) =

Glyph combining two or more letterforms

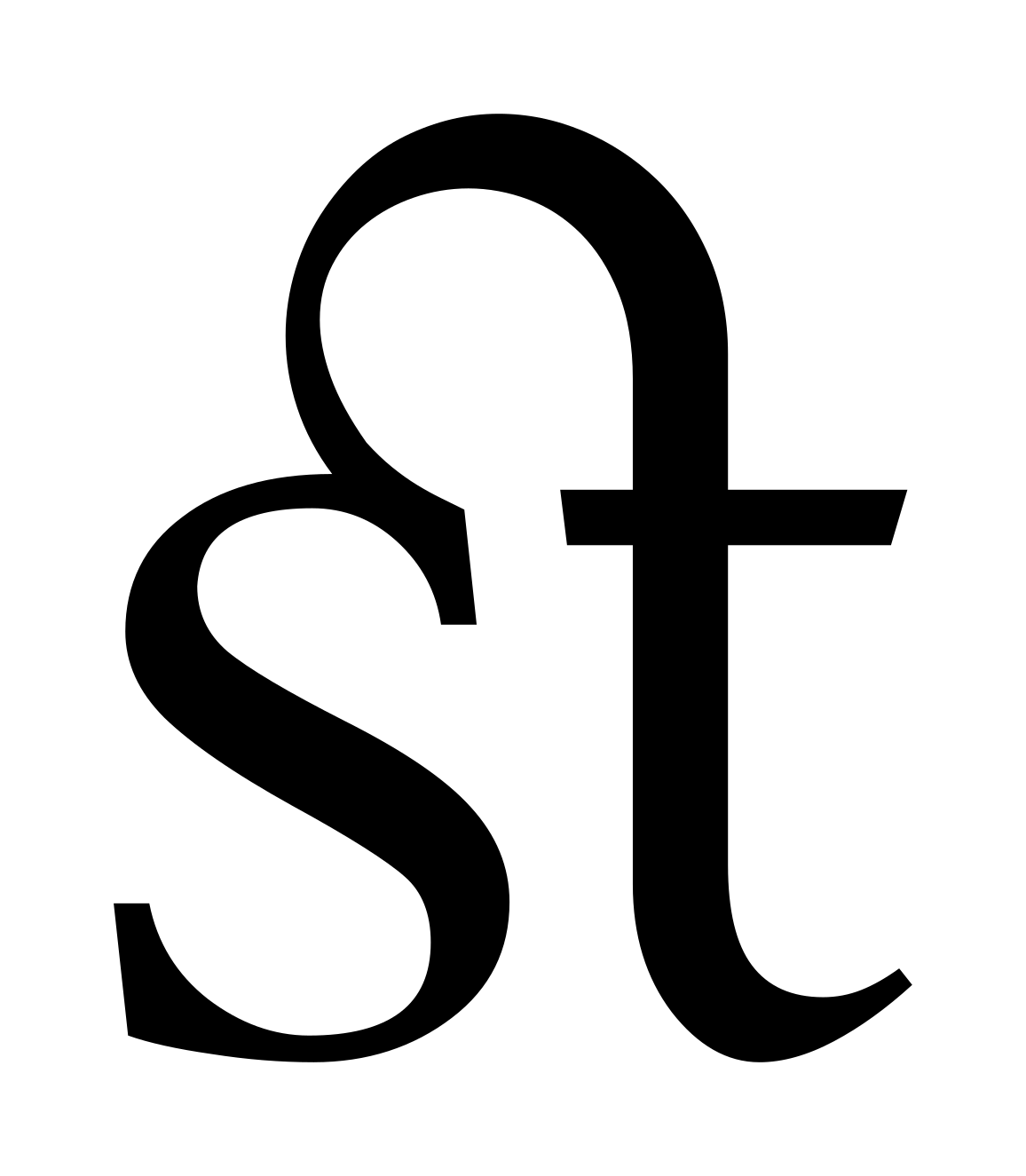
The letters ⟨s⟩ and ⟨t⟩ combined to create the ligature ⟨ﬆ⟩

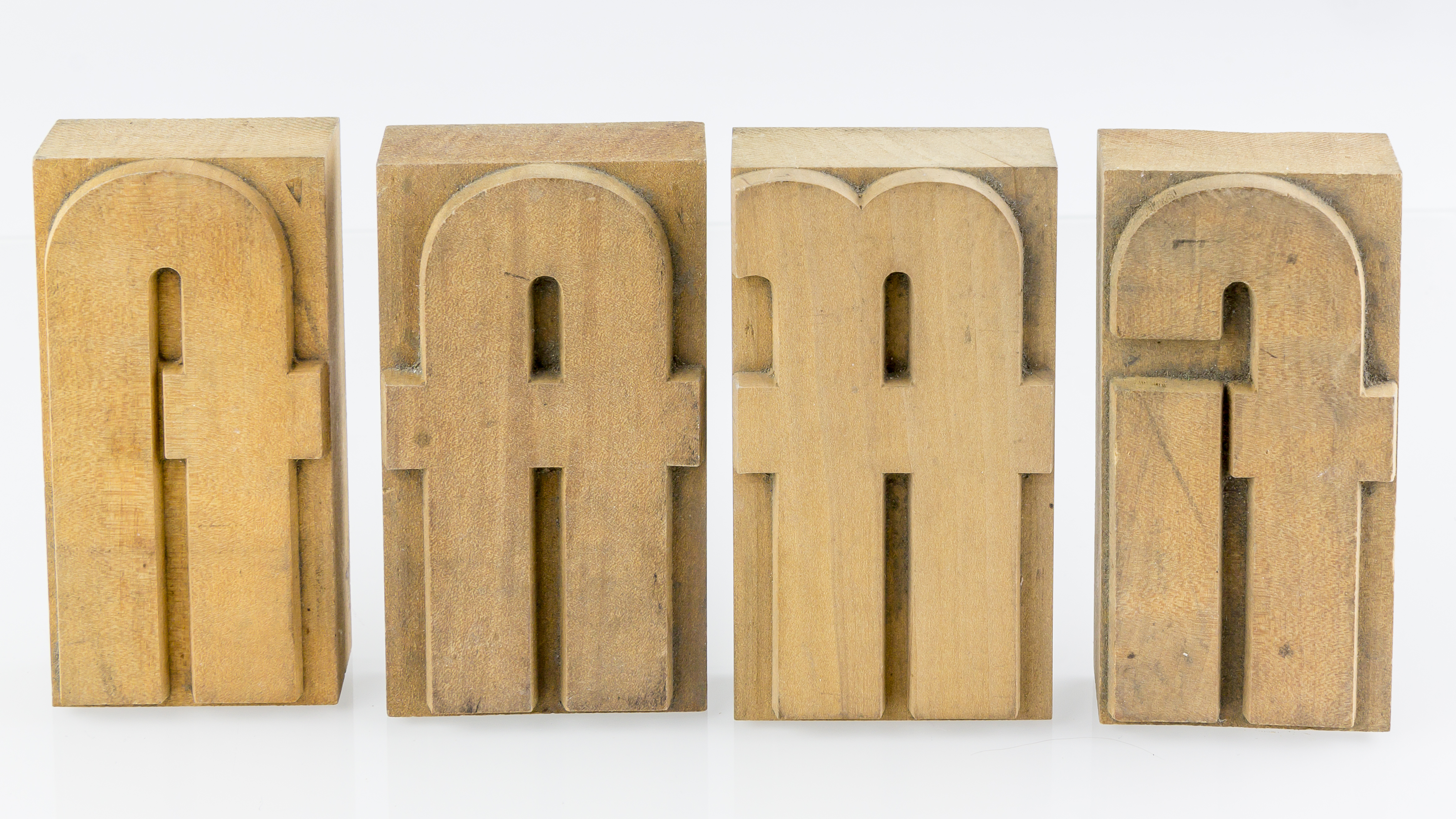
Wood type sorts with ligatures of (from left to right) ⟨fl⟩, ⟨ft⟩, ⟨ff⟩, ⟨fi⟩; in 20 Cicero = 240 Didot points ≈ 90.2328 mm (typeface Futura bold condensed)

In writing and typography, a ligature is the combination of two or more graphemes or letters into one glyph. Common examples include:

- Combining a and e into the ligature ⟨æ⟩
- Combining o and e into the ligature ⟨œ⟩
- Combining f and i into the ligature ⟨ﬁ⟩
- Combining s and t into the ligature ⟨ﬆ⟩.

The ampersand ⟨&⟩ symbol developed from a ligature that combined the handwritten Latin letters e and t (spelling et, Latin for and).

== History ==
The earliest known script Sumerian cuneiform and Egyptian hieratic both include many cases of character combinations that gradually evolve from ligatures into separately recognizable characters. Other notable ligatures, such as the Brahmic abugidas and the Germanic bind rune, figure prominently throughout ancient manuscripts. These new glyphs emerge alongside the proliferation of writing with a stylus, whether on paper or clay, and often for a practical reason: faster handwriting. Merchants especially needed a way to speed up the process of written communication and found that conjoining letters and abbreviating words for lay use was more convenient for record keeping and transactions than the bulky long forms.

Doubles (geminated consonants) during the Roman Republic era were written as a sicilicus. During the medieval era several conventions existed (mostly diacritic marks). However, in Nordic texts a particular type of ligature appeared for ll and tt, referred to as "broken l" and "broken t".

Around the 9th and 10th centuries, monasteries became a fountainhead for such script modifications. Medieval scribes who wrote in Latin increased their writing speed by combining characters and by introducing notational abbreviations. Others conjoined letters for aesthetic purposes. For example, in blackletter, letters with right-facing bowls (⟨b⟩, ⟨o⟩, and ⟨p⟩) and those with left-facing bowls (⟨c⟩, ⟨e⟩, ⟨o⟩, ⟨d⟩, ⟨g⟩, and ⟨q⟩) were written with the facing edges of the bowls superimposed. In many script forms, characters such as ⟨h⟩, ⟨m⟩, and ⟨n⟩ had their vertical strokes superimposed. Scribes also used notational abbreviations to avoid having to write a whole character in one stroke. Manuscripts in the 14th century employed hundreds of such abbreviations.

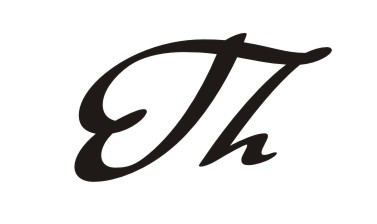
A widely used Th ligature in a handwriting-style typeface

In handwriting, a ligature is made by joining two or more characters in an atypical fashion by merging their parts, or by writing one above or inside the other. In printing, a ligature is a group of characters that is typeset as a unit, so the characters do not have to be joined. For example, in some cases the ⟨fi⟩ ligature prints the letters ⟨f⟩ and ⟨i⟩ with a greater separation than when they are typeset as separate letters. When printing with movable type was invented around 1450, typefaces included many ligatures and additional letters, as they were based on handwriting. Ligatures made printing with movable type easier because one sort would replace frequent combinations of letters and also allowed more complex and interesting character designs which would otherwise collide with one another.

=== Modern times ===
Because of their complexity, ligatures began to fall out of use in the 20th century. Sans serif typefaces, increasingly used for body text, generally avoid ligatures, though notable exceptions include Gill Sans and Futura. Inexpensive phototypesetting machines in the 1970s (which did not require journeyman knowledge or training to operate) also generally avoid them. A few, however, became characters in their own right, see below the sections about German ß, various Latin accented letters, and others.

The trend away from digraph use was further strengthened by the desktop publishing revolution. Early computer software in particular had no way to allow for ligature substitution (the automatic use of ligatures where appropriate), while most new digital typefaces did not include ligatures. As most of the early PC development was designed for the English language (which already treated ligatures as optional at best) dependence on ligatures did not carry over to digital. Ligature use fell as the number of traditional hand compositors and hot metal typesetting machine operators dropped because of the mass production of the IBM Selectric brand of electric typewriter in 1961. A designer active in the period commented: "some of the world's greatest typefaces were quickly becoming some of the world's worst fonts."

However ligatures have grown in popularity in the 21st century because of an increasing interest in creating typesetting systems that evoke arcane designs and classical scripts. One of the first computer typesetting programs to take advantage of computer-driven typesetting (and later laser printers) was Donald Knuth's TeX program. It is now the standard method of mathematical typesetting; its default fonts are explicitly based on 19th-century styles. Many new fonts feature extensive ligature sets; these include FF Scala, Seria, and others by Martin Majoor and Hoefler Text by Jonathan Hoefler. Mrs Eaves by Zuzana Licko contains a particularly large set to allow designers to create dramatic display text with a feel of antiquity. A parallel use of ligatures is seen in the creation of script fonts that join letterforms to simulate handwriting effectively. This trend is caused in part by the increased support for other languages and alphabets in modern computing, many of which use ligatures somewhat extensively. This has caused the development of new digital typesetting techniques such as OpenType, and the incorporation of ligature support into the text display systems of macOS, Windows, and applications like Microsoft Office. An increasing modern trend is to use a "Th" ligature which reduces spacing between these letters to make it easier to read, a trait infrequent in metal type.

Today, modern font programming divides ligatures into three groups, which can be activated separately: standard, contextual, and historical. Standard ligatures are needed to allow the font to display without errors such as character collision. Designers sometimes find contextual and historic ligatures desirable for creating effects or to evoke an old-fashioned print look.

Bluetooth logo

Ligatures are also used for logo creation, such as the Bluetooth logo, (a ligature merging the runes (ᚼ, Hagall), and (ᛒ, Bjarkan)).

== Latin alphabet ==
=== Stylistic ligatures ===
Two common ligatures: fi and fl

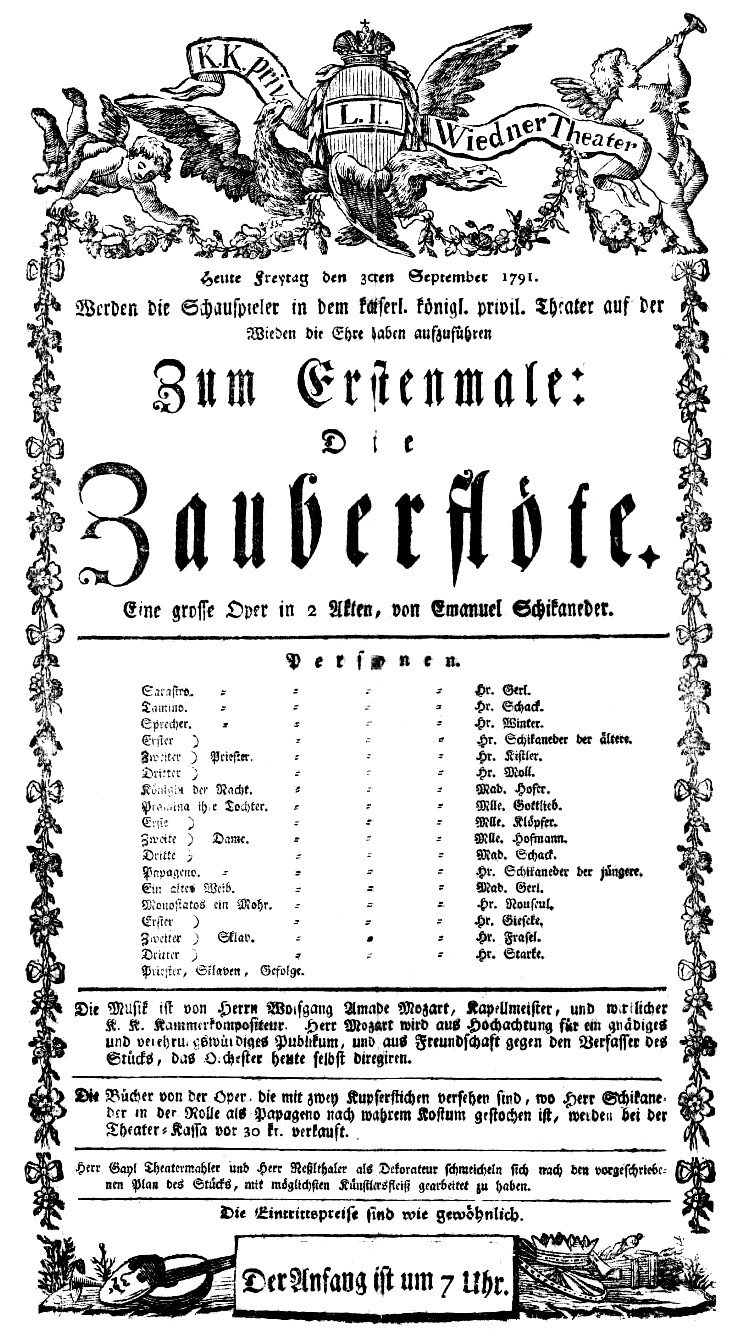
Original program for Die Zauberflöte, featuring ſt (st) and fl ligatures

Capilla de San José, Sevilla. Several ligatures, except cypher, monogram and Signum manus motifs in the top (a Christogram, the Auspice Maria, and one for Saint Joseph).

Many ligatures combine ⟨f⟩ with the following letter. A particularly prominent example is ⟨ﬁ⟩ (or ⟨f‌i⟩, rendered with two normal letters). The tittle of the ⟨i⟩ in many typefaces collides with the hood of the ⟨f⟩ when placed beside each other in a word, and are combined into a single glyph with the tittle absorbed into the ⟨f⟩. Other ligatures with the letter f include ⟨fj⟩, (Note: The combination ⟨fj⟩ is represented in English only in "fjord" and "fjeld", but is encountered in languages where ⟨j⟩ represents a vocalic or semi-vocalic sound (Norwegian, occasionally in Esperanto) or an affix (Hungarian), or where word-compounding results such ligatures (Hungarian)) ⟨f‌l⟩ (⟨ﬂ⟩), ⟨f‌f⟩ (⟨ﬀ⟩), ⟨f‌f‌i⟩ (⟨ﬃ⟩), and ⟨f‌f‌l⟩ (⟨ﬄ⟩). In Linotype, ligature matrices for ⟨fa⟩, ⟨fe⟩, ⟨fo⟩, ⟨fr⟩, ⟨fs⟩, ⟨ft⟩, ⟨fb⟩, ⟨fh⟩, ⟨fu⟩, and ⟨fy⟩; and for ⟨f.⟩, ⟨f,⟩, and ⟨f-⟩ (⟨f⟩ followed by a full stop, comma, or hyphen) are optional in many typefaces, as well as the equivalent set for the doubled ⟨ff⟩, as a method to overcome the machine's physical restrictions.

These arose because with the usual type sort for lowercase ⟨f⟩, the end of its hood is on a kern, which would be damaged by collision with raised parts of the next letter.

Ligatures crossing the morpheme boundary of a composite word are sometimes considered incorrect, especially in official German orthography as outlined in the Duden. An English example of this would be ⟨ff⟩ in shelf‌full; a German example would be Schiff‌fahrt ("boat trip"). (Note: Schiff‌fahrt is written with ff‌f only if the writer follows the spelling reform of 1996. The same standard explicitly allows the spelling Schiff-Fahrt with dash to avoid the tripled f.) Some computer programs (such as TeX) provide a setting to disable ligatures for German, while some users have also written macros to identify which ligatures to disable.

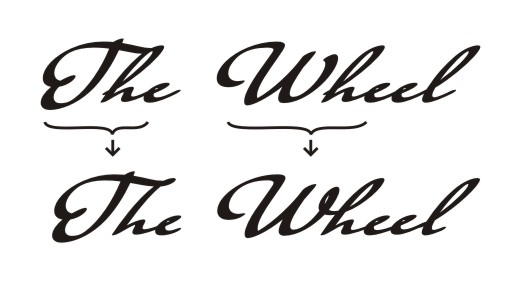
Ligatures "Th" and "Wh" illustration

Turkish distinguishes dotted and dotless "I". If a ligature with f were to be used in words such as fırın [oven] and fikir [idea], this contrast would be obscured. The ⟨fi⟩ ligature, at least in the form typical to other languages, is therefore not used in Turkish typesetting.

Remnants of the ligatures ⟨ſʒ⟩ /⟨ſz⟩ ("sharp s", eszett), and ⟨tʒ⟩/⟨tz⟩ ("T Z", tezett) from Fraktur, a family of German blackletter typefaces, originally mandatory in Fraktur but now employed only stylistically, can be seen to this day on street signs for city squares whose name contains Platz or ends in -platz. Conversely, the "sz" ligature has merged into a single character, the German ß (see below).

Sometimes, ligatures for ⟨st⟩ (⟨ﬆ⟩), ⟨ſt⟩ (⟨ﬅ⟩), ⟨ch⟩, ⟨ck⟩, ⟨ct⟩, ⟨Qu⟩, and ⟨Th⟩ are used (e.g. in the typeface Linux Libertine).

Besides conventional ligatures, in the metal type era some newspapers commissioned custom condensed single sorts for common long names that might appear in news headings, such as "Eisenhower", "Chamberlain". In these cases the characters did not appear combined, just more tightly spaced than if printed conventionally.

=== German ß ===
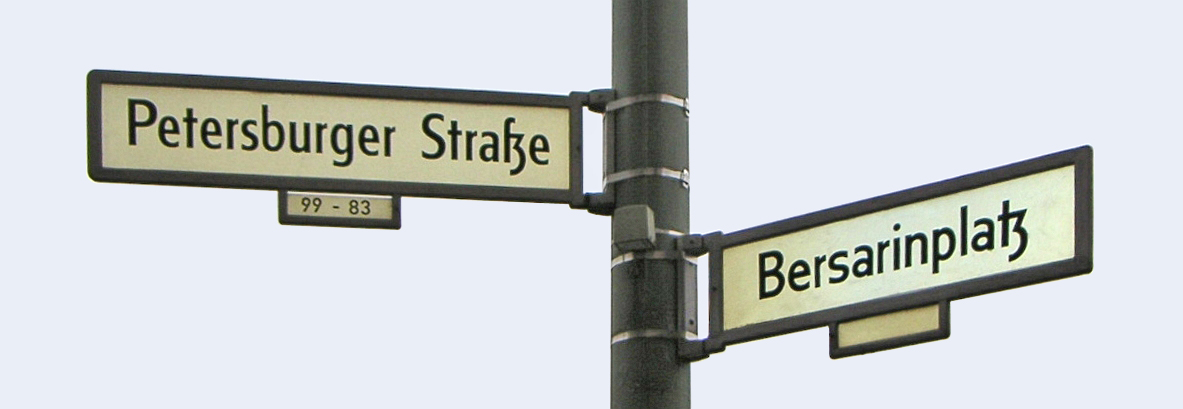
"ß" in the form of a "ſʒ" ligature on a street sign in Berlin (Petersburger Straße). The sign on the right (Bersarinplatz) ends with a "tʒ" ligature ("ꜩ").

The German letter ⟨ß⟩ (Eszett, also called the scharfes S, meaning sharp s) is an official letter of the alphabet in Germany and Austria. A recognizable ligature representing the ⟨sz⟩ digraph develops in handwriting in the early 14th century. Its name Es-zett (meaning S-Z) suggests a connection of "long s and z" (ſʒ) but the Latin script also knows a ligature of "long s over round s" (ſs). Since German was mostly set in blackletter typefaces until the 1940s, and those typefaces were rarely set in uppercase, a capital version of the Eszett never came into common use, even though its creation has been discussed since the end of the 19th century. Therefore, the common replacement in uppercase typesetting was originally SZ (Maße "measure" → MAS‌ZE, different from Mas‌se "mass" → MAS‌SE) and later SS (Maße → MAS‌SE). Until 2017, the SS replacement was the only valid spelling according to the official orthography in Germany and Austria. In Switzerland, the ß is omitted altogether in favour of ss. A capital version (ẞ) of the Eszett character has occasionally been used since 1905/06, has been part of Unicode since 2008, and has appeared in more and more typefaces. Since the end of 2010, the Ständiger Ausschuss für geographische Namen (StAGN) has suggested the new upper case character for "ß" rather than replacing it with "SS" or "SZ" for geographical names. A new standardized German keyboard layout (DIN 2137-T2) has included the capital ß since 2012. The new character entered the official orthographic rules in June 2017.

=== Massachusett ꝏ ===
A prominent feature of the colonial orthography created by John Eliot (later used in the first Bible printed in the Americas, the Mamusse Wunneetupanatamwe Up-Biblum God, written for the Massachusett language and published in 1663) was the use of the double-o ligature ⟨ꝏ⟩ to represent the /u/ of food as opposed to the /ʊ/ of hook (although Eliot himself used ⟨oo⟩ and ⟨ꝏ⟩ interchangeably). In the orthography in use since 2000 in the Wampanoag communities participating in the Wôpanâak Language Reclamation Project (WLRP), the ligature was replaced with the numeral ⟨8⟩, partly because of its ease in typesetting and display as well as its similarity to the o-u ligature ⟨Ȣ⟩ used in Abenaki. For example, compare the colonial-era spelling seepꝏash with the modern Wôpanâak Language Reclamation Project (WLRP) spelling seep8ash.

=== Letter W ===
As the letter ⟨W⟩ is an addition to the Latin alphabet that originated in the seventh century, the phoneme it represents was formerly written in various ways. In Old English, the runic letter wynn ⟨Ƿ⟩ was used, but Norman influence forced wynn out of use. By the 14th century, the "new" letter ⟨W⟩, originated as two ⟨V⟩ glyphs or ⟨U⟩ glyphs joined, developed into a legitimate letter with its own position in the alphabet. Because of its relative youth compared to other letters of the alphabet, only a few European languages (including Breton, Dutch, English, German, Maltese, Polish, Walloon, and Welsh) use the letter in native words.

=== Æ and Œ ===
The ligatures of Adobe Caslon Pro

The character ⟨Æ⟩ (lower case ⟨æ⟩; in ancient times named æsc) when used in Danish, Norwegian, Icelandic, or Old English is not a typographic ligature. It is a distinct letter — a vowel — and when collated, is often given a different place in the alphabetical order than Ae (see Danish and Norwegian alphabet).

In modern English orthography, ⟨Æ⟩ is not considered an independent letter but a spelling variant, for example: "encyclopædia" versus "encyclopaedia" or "encyclopedia". In this use, ⟨Æ⟩ comes from Medieval Latin, where it was an optional ligature in some specific words that had been transliterated and borrowed from Ancient Greek, for example, "Æneas". It is still found as a variant in English and French words descended or borrowed from Medieval Latin, but the trend has recently been toward printing the ⟨A⟩ and ⟨E⟩ separately.

Similarly, ⟨Œ⟩ and ⟨œ⟩, while normally printed as ligatures in French, are replaced by component letters if technical restrictions require it.

=== Hwair ===
The letter hwair ⟨ƕ⟩, used only in transliteration of the Gothic language, resembles a ⟨hw⟩ ligature. It was introduced by philologists around 1900 to replace the digraph ⟨hv⟩ formerly used to express the phoneme in question, e.g. by Migne in the 1860s (Patrologia Latina vol. 18).

=== Byzantine Ȣ ===
The Byzantines had a unique o-u ligature ⟨Ȣ⟩ that, while originally based on the Greek alphabet's ο-υ, carried over into Latin alphabets as well. This ligature is still seen today on icon artwork in Greek Orthodox churches, and sometimes in graffiti or other forms of informal or decorative writing.

=== Gha ===
Gha ⟨ƣ⟩, a rarely used letter based on Q, was misconstrued by the ISO to be an OI ligature because of its appearance, and is thus permanently named in Unicode as "Oi", though that has been amended with a correction. Historically, it was used in many Latin-based orthographies of Turkic (e.g., Azerbaijani) and other central Asian languages.

=== International Phonetic Alphabet ===
The International Phonetic Alphabet formerly used ligatures to represent affricate consonants, which are encoded in Unicode: ʣ, ʤ, ꭦ, ʥ, 𝼠, 𝼡, 𝼟, ʦ, ʧ, ꭧ, ʨ, 𝼢, 𝼣, and 𝼤. One fricative consonant is still represented with a ligature: ɮ, and the extensions to the IPA contain three more: ʩ, ʪ, and ʫ.

=== Initial Teaching Alphabet ===
The Initial Teaching Alphabet, a short-lived alphabet intended for young children, used a number of ligatures to represent long vowels: ⟨æ⟩, ⟨ꜷ⟩, ⟨𝽜⟩, ⟨𝽝⟩, ⟨œ⟩, ⟨𝽞⟩, ⟨𝽟⟩, and ⟨ᵫ⟩. Ligatures for consonants also existed, including ligatures of ⟨𝽛⟩, ⟨𝽢⟩, ⟨𝽣⟩, ⟨𝽤⟩, and ⟨𝽥⟩. The ligatures were added to Unicode 18.0 in 2026.

=== Rare ligatures ===
Rarer ligatures also exist, including ⟨ꜳ⟩; ⟨ꜵ⟩; ⟨ꜷ⟩; ⟨ꜹ⟩; ⟨ꜻ⟩ (barred ⟨av⟩); ⟨ꜽ⟩; ⟨ꝏ⟩, which is used in medieval Nordic languages for /oː/ (a long close-mid back rounded vowel), as well as in some orthographies of the Massachusett language to represent uː (a long close back rounded vowel); ⟨ᵺ⟩; ⟨ỻ⟩, which was used in Medieval Welsh to represent ɬ (the voiceless lateral fricative); ⟨ꜩ⟩; ⟨ᴂ⟩; ⟨ᴔ⟩; and ⟨ꭣ⟩ have Unicode codepoints (in code block Latin Extended-E for characters used in German dialectology (Teuthonista), the Anthropos alphabet, Sakha, and Americanist usage).

=== Symbols originating as ligatures ===
An et ligature in a humanist script

The most common ligature in modern usage is the ampersand ⟨&⟩ . This was originally a ligature of ⟨E⟩ and ⟨t⟩ , forming the Latin: et, meaning and. It has exactly the same use in French and in English. The ampersand comes in many different forms. Because of its ubiquity, it is generally no longer considered a ligature, but a logogram. Like many other ligatures, it has at times been considered a letter (e.g., in early Modern English); in English it is pronounced and, not et. In most typefaces, it does not immediately resemble the two letters used to form it, although certain typefaces use designs in the form of a ligature (examples include the original versions of Futura and Univers, Trebuchet MS, and Civilité, known in modern times as the italic of Garamond).

Similarly, the number sign ⟨#⟩ originated as a stylized abbreviation of the Roman term libra pondo, written as ⟨℔⟩. Over time, the number sign was simplified to how it is seen today, with two horizontal strokes across two slash-like strokes. Now a logogram, the symbol is used mainly to denote (in the US) numbers, and weight in pounds. It has also been used popularly on push-button telephones and as the hashtag indicator.

The at sign ⟨@⟩ is possibly a ligature, but there are many different theories about the origin. One theory says that the French word à (meaning at), was simplified by scribes who, instead of lifting the pen to write the grave accent, drew an arc around the ⟨a⟩. Another states that it is short for the Latin word for toward, ad, with the ⟨d⟩ being represented by the arc. Another says it is short for an abbreviation of the term each at, with the ⟨e⟩ encasing the ⟨a⟩. Around the 18th century, it started being used in commerce to indicate price per unit, as "15 units @ $1". After the popularization of Email, this fairly unpopular character became widely known, used to tag specific users. Lately, it has been used to de-gender nouns in Spanish with no agreed pronunciation.

The dollar sign ⟨$⟩ probably originated as a ligature but is now a logogram.

The Spanish peseta was sometimes abbreviated by a ligature ⟨₧⟩ (from Pts). The ligature ⟨₣⟩ (F-with-bar, from Fr) was proposed in 1968 by Édouard Balladur, Minister of Economy. as a symbol for the French franc but was never adopted nor officially used before its replacement with the euro in 2002. Other historic currency symbols expressed with Latin letter ligatures recognized by Unicode include the cruzeiro sign (₢, from Cr), the rupee sign (historically ₨, usually from Rs, though occasionally rendered as Rp; in India, another ligature ₹—that of Latin R rotunda, the = sign, and Sanskrit र—has since replaced it), the livre tournois (₶, from lt), spesmilo (₷, from Sm), and the euro's predecessor, the European Currency Unit (₠, from CE).

The symbol for Saturn in late Classical (4th & 5th c.) and medieval Byzantine (11th c.) manuscripts, derives from ⟨κρ⟩ (kappa-rho).

In astronomy, the planetary symbol for Mercury (☿) may be a ligature of Mercury's caduceus and a cross (which was added in the 16th century to Christianize the pagan symbol), though other sources disagree; the symbol for Venus ♀ may be a ligature of the Greek letters ⟨ϕ⟩ (phi) and ⟨κ⟩ (kappa). The symbol for Jupiter (♃) descends from a Greek zeta with a horizontal stroke, ⟨Ƶ⟩, as an abbreviation for Zeus. Saturn's astronomical symbol (♄) has been traced back to the Greek Oxyrhynchus Papyri, where it can be seen to be a Greek kappa-rho with a horizontal stroke, as an abbreviation for Κρονος (Cronus), the Greek name for the planet. It later came to look like a lower-case Greek eta, with the cross added at the top in the 16th century to Christianize it. The dwarf planet Pluto is symbolized by a PL ligature, ♇.

A different PL ligature, ⅊, represents the property line in surveying.

In engineering diagrams, a CL ligature, ℄, represents the center line of an object.

The interrobang ⟨‽⟩ is an unconventional punctuation meant to combine the interrogation point (or the question mark) and the bang (printer's slang for exclamation mark) into one symbol, used to denote a sentence which is both a question and is exclaimed. For example, the sentence "Is that actually true‽" shows that the speaker is surprised while asking their question.

Alchemy used a set of mostly standardized symbols, many of which were ligatures: 🜇 (AR, for aqua regia); 🜈 (S inside a V, for aqua vitae); 🝫 (MB, for balneum Mariae [Mary's bath], a double boiler); 🝬 (VB, for balneum vaporis, a steam bath); and 🝛 (aaa with overline, for amalgam).

Composer Arnold Schoenberg introduced two ligatures as musical symbols to denote melody and countermelody. The symbols are ligatures of HT and NT, 𝆦 and 𝆧, from the German for hauptstimme and nebenstimme respectively.

=== Digraphs ===
Uppercase IJ digraph rendered as a "broken-U" in Helvetica by Omega TeX

Comparison of ĳ and y in various forms

Digraphs, such as ⟨ll⟩ in Spanish or Welsh, are not ligatures in the general case as the two letters are displayed as separate glyphs: although written together, when they are joined in handwriting or italic fonts the base form of the letters is not changed and the individual glyphs remain separate. Like some ligatures discussed above, these digraphs may or may not be considered individual letters in their respective languages. Until the 1994 spelling reform, the digraphs ⟨ch⟩ and ⟨ll⟩ were considered separate letters in Spanish for collation purposes. Catalan makes a difference between "Spanish ll" or palatalized l, written ll as in llei (law), and "French ll" or geminated l, written l·l as in col·lega (colleague).

The difference can be illustrated with the French digraph œu, which is composed of the ligature œ and the simplex letter u.

=== Dutch IJ ===
In Dutch, ⟨ĳ⟩ can be considered a digraph, a ligature, or a letter in itself, depending on the standard used. Its uppercase and lowercase forms are often available as a single glyph with a distinctive ligature in several professional typefaces (e.g. Zapfino). Sans serif uppercase ⟨Ĳ⟩ glyphs, popular in the Netherlands, typically use a ligature resembling a ⟨U⟩ with a broken left-hand stroke. Adding to the confusion, Dutch handwriting can render ⟨y⟩ (which is not found in native Dutch words, but occurs in words borrowed from other languages) as a ⟨ĳ⟩-glyph without the dots in its lowercase form and the ⟨Ĳ⟩ in its uppercase form looking virtually identical (only slightly bigger). When written as two separate letters, both should be capitalized – or both not – to form a correctly spelled word, like IJs or ijs (ice).

== Non-Latin alphabets ==
The Devanagari ddhrya-ligature (द् + ध् + र् + य = द्ध्र्य) of JanaSanskritSans

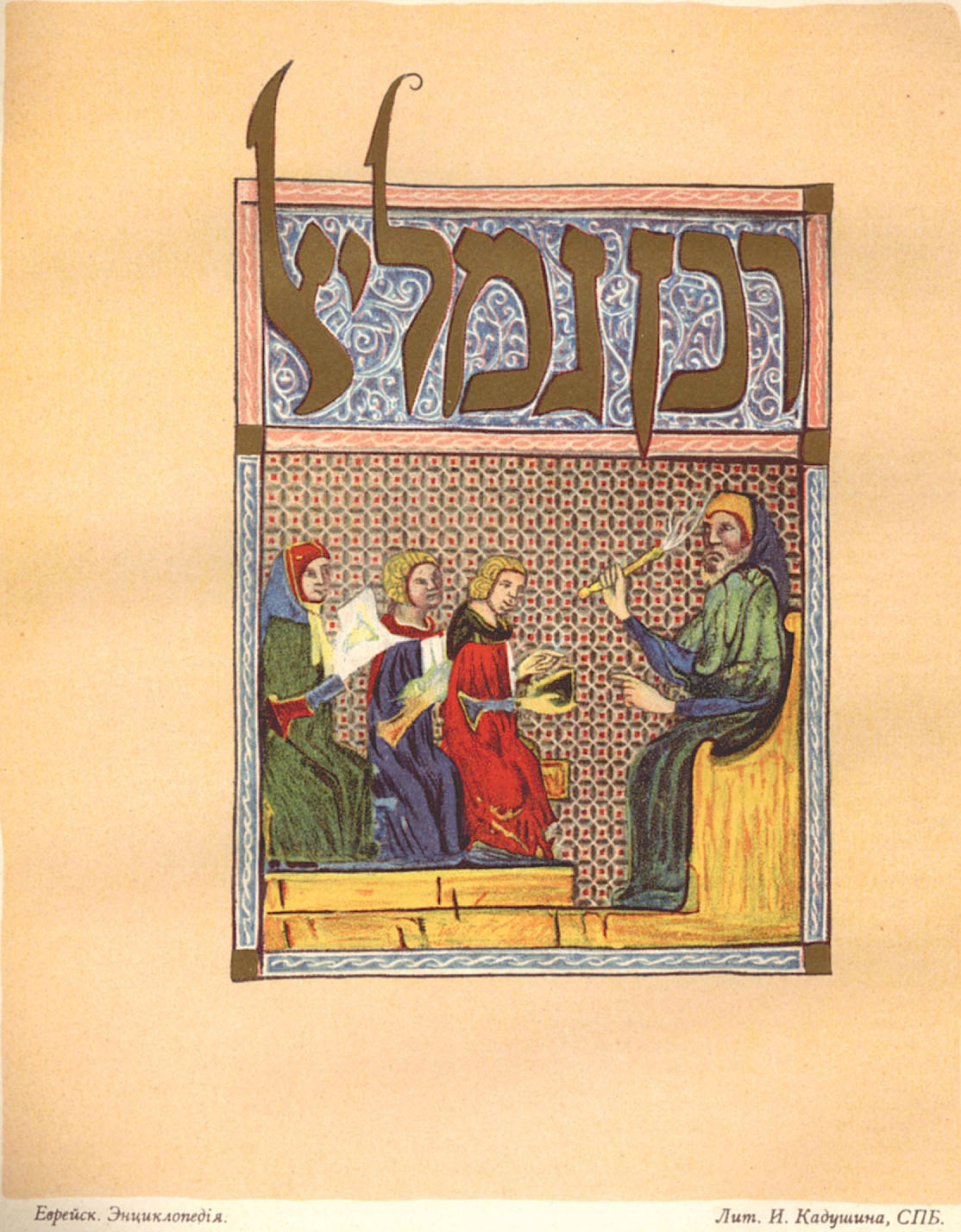
Hebrew text: the letter in the upper left is ﭏ, a ligature of aleph (א) and lamed (ל).

Ligatures are not limited to Latin script:

- The Armenian alphabet has the following ligatures: և (ե+ւ), ﬔ (մ+ե), ﬕ (մ+ի), ﬓ (մ+ն), ﬗ (մ+խ), ﬖ (վ+ն)
- The symbols used for the inequalities "greater than or equal to" (≥) and "less than or equal to" (≤) are the combination of an equals sign (=) and the "greater than" sign (>) or "less than" sign (<) respectively.
- Most Brahmic abugidas make frequent use of ligatures in consonant clusters. The number of ligatures employed is language-dependent; thus many more ligatures are conventionally used in Devanagari when writing Sanskrit than when writing Hindi. Having 37 consonants in total, the total number of ligatures that can be formed in Devanagari using only two letters is 1369, though few fonts can render all of them. In particular, Mangal, which is included with Microsoft Windows' Indic support, does not correctly handle ligatures with consonants attached to the right of the characters द, ट, ठ, ड, and ढ, leaving the virama attached to them and displaying the following consonant in its standard form.
- The Georgian script includes უ (uni), which is a combination of ო (oni) and the former letter ჳ (vie).
- A number of ligatures have been employed in the Greek alphabet, in particular a combination of omicron (Ο) and upsilon (Υ), which later gave rise to a letter of the Cyrillic script—see Ou (ligature). Among the ancient Greek acrophonic numerals, ligatures were common (in fact, the ligature of a short-legged capital pi was a key feature of the acrophonic numeral system).
- Cyrillic ligatures: Љ, Њ, Ы, Ѿ. Iotated Cyrillic letters are ligatures of the early Cyrillic decimal I and another vowel: Ꙗ, Ѥ, Ѩ, Ѭ, Ю (sometimes also spelled ЮУ). In Serbian Cyrillic alphabet, the letters lje and nje (љ, њ), were developed as ligatures of Cyrillic used in Serbian language, being el and en (л, н) with the soft sign (ь). They were invented by Vuk Stefanović Karadžić for use in his 1818 dictionary, replacing the earlier digraphs ⟨ль⟩ and ⟨нь⟩. The yae, a ligature of ya (Я) and e also exists: Ԙԙ, as do dzze (Ꚉꚉ ← Д + З) and zhwe (Ꚅꚅ ← З + Ж).
- Some forms of the Glagolitic script, used from Middle Ages to the 19th century to write some Slavic languages, have a box-like shape that lends itself to more frequent use of ligatures.
- In the Hebrew alphabet, the letters aleph (א) and lamed (ל) can form a ligature, ﭏ. The ligature appears in some pre-modern texts (mainly religious), or in Judeo-Arabic and Ladino texts, where that combination is very frequent, since [ʔ] [a]l- (written aleph plus lamed, in the Hebrew script) is the definite article in Arabic, and el is the masculine singular definite article in Spanish. By using the ligature, it avoids writing El (אל), one of the names of God in Judaism. For example, the word Allah (אַללַּהּ) can be written with this ligature: ﭏלה.
- In the Arabic alphabet, historically a cursive derived from the Nabataean script, most letters' shapes depend on whether they are followed (word-initial), preceded (word-final), or both (medial) by other letters. For example, Arabic mīm, isolated م, tripled (mmm, rendering as initial, medial, and final): ممم. Notable are the shapes taken by lām + ʼalif isolated: ﻻ, and lām + ʼalif medial or final: ﻼ. Besides the obligatory lām + ʼalif ligature, Arabic script grammar requires numerous stylistic ligatures.
- Syriac, a semitic alphabet derived from the Aramaic alphabet, has three different scripts that all use ligatures. Like Arabic, some letters change their form depending on their position in relation to other letters, and this can also change how ligatures look. A popular ligature all three scripts use is lamadh ܠ/ܠ + alap ܐ/ܐ isolated and final: (Serto) ܠܐ, (Madnhaya) ܠܐ. Another popular one is taw ܬ/ܬ + alap ܐ/ܐ, resulting in (Serto) ܬܐ, (Madhnhaya) ـܬܐ. All three scripts use ligatures, but not in an equal spread or always with the same letters. Serto, being a flexible script, especially has many ligatures. For a wider, but not complete, list of Syriac ligatures, see Contextual forms of letters.
- Urdu (one of the main languages of South Asia), which uses a calligraphic version of the Arabic-based Nastaʿlīq script, requires a great number of ligatures in digital typography. InPage, a widely used desktop publishing tool for Urdu, uses Nastaliq fonts with over 20,000 ligatures.
- In American Sign Language a ligature of the American manual alphabet is used to sign "I love you", from the English initialism ILY. It consists of the little finger of the letter I plus the thumb and forefinger of the letter L. The letter Y (little finger and thumb) overlaps with the other two letters.
- The Japanese language has a number of obsolete kana ligatures. Of these, only two are widely available ones on computers: one for hiragana, ゟ, which is a vertical writing ligature of the characters よ and り; and one for katakana, ヿ, which is a vertical writing ligature of the characters コ and ト.
- Lao uses three ligatures, all comprising the letter ຫ (h). As a tonal language, most consonant sounds in Lao are represented by two consonants, which will govern the tone of the syllable. Five consonant sounds are only represented by a single consonant letter (ງ (ŋ), ນ (m), ມ (n), ລ (l), ວ (w)), meaning that one cannot render all the tones for words beginning with these sounds. A silent ຫ indicates that the syllable should be read with the tone rules for ຫ, rather than those of the following consonant. Three consonants can form ligatures with the letter ຫ. ຫ+ນ=ໜ (n), ຫ+ມ=ໝ (m), and ຫ+ລ=ຫຼ (l). ງ (ŋ) and ວ (w) just form clusters: ຫງ (ŋ) and ຫວ (w). ລ (l) can also be used written in a cluster rather than as a ligature: ຫລ (l).
- In many runic texts ligatures are common. Such ligatures are known as bind-runes and were optional.

=== Chinese ligatures ===
"" an example of a Chinese chéngyǔ (expression) written as a ligature. It reads Kǒng Mèng hàoxué (孔孟好學) and means "to be as studious as Confucius and Mencius." All four characters contain 子 as a component – left, top, right, and bottom respectively – and share it at the center of the composition.

Written Chinese has a long history of creating new characters by merging parts or wholes of other Chinese characters. However, a few of these combinations do not represent morphemes but retain the original multi-character (multiple morpheme) reading and are therefore not considered true characters themselves. In Chinese, these ligatures are called héwén (合文) or héshū (合書); see polysyllabic Chinese characters for more.

One popular ligature used on chūntiē decorations used for Chinese Lunar New Year is "" a combination of the four characters for zhāocái jìnbǎo (招財進寶), meaning "ushering in wealth and fortune" and used as a popular New Year's greeting.

Chinese ligatures

"" Chinese ligature for zhāocái jìnbǎo (招財進寶), a popular New Year's greeting

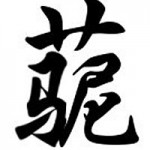
"" humorous ligature of 草泥马 (cǎonímǎ)

In 1924, Du Dingyou (杜定友; 1898–1967) created the ligature 圕 from two of the three characters 圖書館 (túshūguǎn), meaning "library". Although it does have an assigned pronunciation of tuān and appears in many dictionaries, it is not a morpheme and cannot be used as such in Chinese. Instead, it is usually considered a graphic representation of túshūguǎn.

Similar to the ligatures were several "two-syllable Chinese characters" (雙音節漢字) created in the 19th century as Chinese characters for SI units. In Chinese these units are disyllabic and standardly written with two characters, as 厘米 límǐ "centimeter" (厘 centi-, 米 meter) or 千瓦 qiānwǎ "kilowatt". However, in the 19th century these were often written via compound characters, pronounced disyllabically, such as 瓩 for 千瓦 or 糎 for 厘米 – some of these characters were also used in Japan, where they were pronounced with borrowed European readings instead. These have now fallen out of general use, but are occasionally seen.

=== Japanese ligatures ===
The CJK Compatibility Unicode block features characters that have been combined into one square character in the legacy character set so that it matches Japanese text. For example, the Japanese equivalent of "stock company", 株式会社 (kabushiki gaisha) can be represented in 1 Unicode character ⟨㍿⟩. Its romanized abbreviation K.K. can also be 1 character ⟨㏍⟩. There are other Latin abbreviations such as kg for "kilogram" that can be ligated into 1 square character ⟨㎏⟩.

== Computer typesetting ==
Some examples of ligatures in Latin script

The OpenType font format includes features for associating multiple glyphs to a single character, used for ligature substitution. Typesetting software may or may not implement this feature, even if it is explicitly present in the font's metadata. XeTeX is a TeX typesetting engine designed to make the most of such advanced features. This type of substitution used to be needed mainly for typesetting Arabic texts, but ligature lookups and substitutions are being put into all kinds of Western Latin OpenType fonts. In OpenType, there are standard liga, historical hlig, contextual clig, discretionary dlig, and required rlig ligatures.

=== TeX ===
Opinion is divided over whether it is the job of writers or typesetters to decide where to use ligatures. TeX is an example of a computer typesetting system that makes use of ligatures automatically. The Computer Modern Roman typeface provided with TeX includes the five common ligatures ⟨ff⟩, ⟨fi⟩, ⟨fl⟩, ⟨ffi⟩, and ⟨ffl⟩. When TeX finds these combinations in a text, it substitutes the appropriate ligature, unless overridden by the typesetter.

=== CSS ===
CSS3 provides control over these properties using font-feature-settings, though the CSS Fonts Module Level 4 draft standard indicates that authors should prefer several other properties. Those include font-variant-ligatures, common-ligatures, discretionary-ligatures, historical-ligatures, and contextual.

=== Ligatures in Unicode (Latin alphabets) ===
This table below shows discrete letter pairs on the left, the corresponding Unicode ligature in the middle column, and the Unicode code point on the right. Provided you are using an operating system and browser that can handle Unicode, and have the correct Unicode fonts installed, some or all of these will display correctly. See also the provided graphic.

Unicode maintains that ligaturing is a presentation issue rather than a character definition issue, and that, for example, "if a modern font is asked to display 'h' followed by 'r', and the font has an 'hr' ligature in it, it can display the ligature." Accordingly, the use of the special Unicode ligature characters is "discouraged", and "no more will be encoded in any circumstances". (Unicode has continued to add ligatures, but only in such cases that the ligatures were used as distinct letters in a language or could be interpreted as standalone symbols. For example, ligatures such as æ and œ are not used to replace arbitrary "ae" or "oe" sequences; it is generally considered incorrect to write "does" as "dœs".)

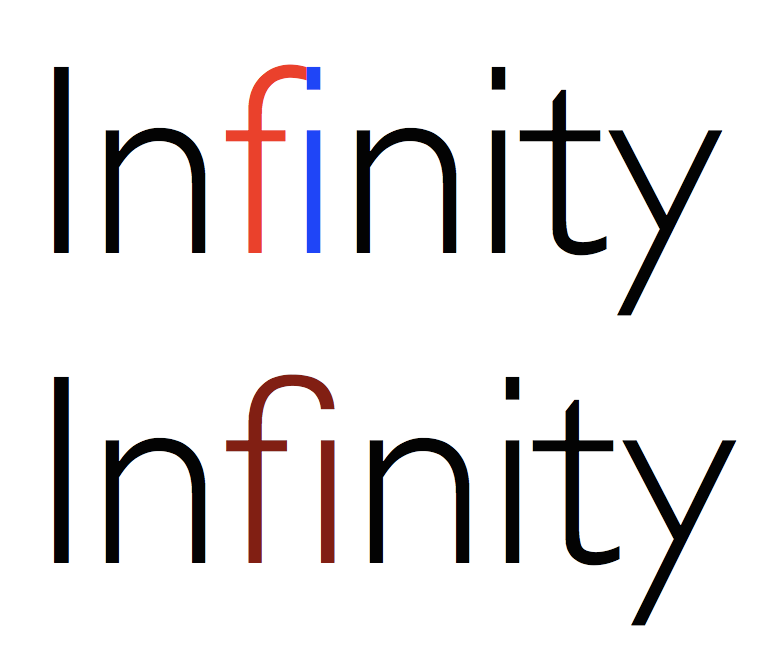
Microsoft Word does not enable ligatures by default. Here, with Gill Sans Light, the 'f' and 'i' appear superimposed when default settings are used.

Microsoft Word disables ligature substitution by default, largely for backward compatibility when editing documents created in earlier versions of Word. Users can enable automatic ligature substitution on the Advanced tab of the Font dialog box.

LibreOffice Writer enables standard ligature substitution by default for OpenType fonts, user can enable or disable any ligature substitution on the Features dialog box, which is accessible via the Features button of the Character dialog box, or alternatively, input a syntax with font name and feature into the Font Name input box, for example: Noto Sans:liga=0.

The Medieval Unicode Font Initiative includes encodings for ligatures not yet deemed worthy to be included in Unicode; its prescribed code points for such ligatures are located in the Private Use Areas.

Non-ligature	Ligature	Unicode	HTML mnemonic
AA, aa	Ꜳ, ꜳ	U+A732 Ꜳ LATIN CAPITAL LETTER AA, U+A733 ꜳ LATIN SMALL LETTER AA	
AE, ae	Æ, æ	U+00C6 Æ LATIN CAPITAL LETTER AE, U+00E6 æ LATIN SMALL LETTER AE	&AElig; &aelig;
AO, ao	Ꜵ, ꜵ	U+A734 Ꜵ LATIN CAPITAL LETTER AO, U+A735 ꜵ LATIN SMALL LETTER AO	
AU, au	Ꜷ, ꜷ	U+A736 Ꜷ LATIN CAPITAL LETTER AU, U+A737 ꜷ LATIN SMALL LETTER AU	
AV, av	Ꜹ, ꜹ	U+A738 Ꜹ LATIN CAPITAL LETTER AV, U+A739 ꜹ LATIN SMALL LETTER AV	
AV̶,av̶	Ꜻ, ꜻ	U+A73A Ꜻ LATIN CAPITAL LETTER AV WITH HORIZONTAL BAR, U+A73B ꜻ LATIN SMALL LETTER AV WITH HORIZONTAL BAR	
AY, ay	Ꜽ, ꜽ	U+A73C Ꜽ LATIN CAPITAL LETTER AY, U+A73D ꜽ LATIN SMALL LETTER AY	
ʗh	𝽛	U+1DF5B 𝽛 LATIN SMALL LETTER STRETCHED C-H DIGRAPH	
et	🙰	U+1F670 🙰 SCRIPT LIGATURE ET ORNAMENT	
et	&	U+0026 & AMPERSAND	&amp;
Et, et	Ꝫ, ꝫ	U+A76A Ꝫ LATIN CAPITAL LETTER ET, U+A76B ꝫ LATIN SMALL LETTER ET	
ϵϵ	𝽜	U+1DF5C 𝽜 LATIN SMALL LETTER LUNATE EE	
f‌f	ﬀ	U+FB00 ﬀ LATIN SMALL LIGATURE FF	&fflig;
f‌f‌i	ﬃ	U+FB03 ﬃ LATIN SMALL LIGATURE FFI	&ffilig;
f‌f‌l	ﬄ	U+FB04 ﬄ LATIN SMALL LIGATURE FFL	&ffllig;
f‌i	ﬁ	U+FB01 ﬁ LATIN SMALL LIGATURE FI	&filig;
f‌l	ﬂ	U+FB02 ﬂ LATIN SMALL LIGATURE FL	&fllig;
hŋ	ꜧ	U+A727 ꜧ LATIN SMALL LETTER HENG	
superscript HT	𝆦	U+1D1A6 𝆦 MUSICAL SYMBOL HAUPTSTIMME	
Hv or Hu, hv or hu	Ƕ, ƕ	U+01F6 Ƕ LATIN CAPITAL LETTER HWAIR, U+0195 ƕ LATIN SMALL LETTER HV	
ie	𝽝	U+1DF5D 𝽝 LATIN SMALL LETTER IE	
ɪe	ꭡ	U+AB61 ꭡ LATIN SMALL LETTER IOTIFIED E	
IS, is	Ꝭ, ꝭ	U+A76C Ꝭ LATIN CAPITAL LETTER IS, U+A76D ꝭ LATIN SMALL LETTER IS	
lb	℔	U+2114 ℔ L B BAR SYMBOL	
LL, ll	Ỻ, ỻ	U+1EFA Ỻ LATIN CAPITAL LETTER MIDDLE-WELSH LL, U+1EFB ỻ LATIN SMALL LETTER MIDDLE-WELSH LL	
Ng or Nj, ng or nj	Ŋ, ŋ	U+014A Ŋ LATIN CAPITAL LETTER ENG, U+014B ŋ LATIN SMALL LETTER ENG	&eng;
superscript NT	𝆧	U+1D1A7 𝆧 MUSICAL SYMBOL NEBENSTIMME	
OE, oe	Œ, œ	U+0152 Œ LATIN CAPITAL LIGATURE OE, U+0153 œ LATIN SMALL LIGATURE OE	&OElig; &oelig;
ɔe	ꭢ	U+AB62 ꭢ LATIN SMALL LETTER OPEN OE	
oi	𝽞	U+1DF5E 𝽞 LATIN SMALL LETTER OI DIGRAPH	
OO, oo	Ꝏ, ꝏ	U+A74E Ꝏ LATIN CAPITAL LETTER OO, U+A74F ꝏ LATIN SMALL LETTER OO	
ou	𝽟	U+1DF5F 𝽟 LATIN SMALL LETTER OU DIGRAPH	
ſh	𝽢	U+1DF62 𝽢 LATIN SMALL LETTER ESH-H DIGRAPH	
SS, ſs	Ꟗ, ꟗ	U+A7D6 Ꟗ LATIN CAPITAL LETTER MIDDLE SCOTS S, U+A7D7 ꟗ LATIN SMALL LETTER MIDDLE SCOTS S	
ſs or ſz, SS or SZ	ẞ, ß	U+1E9E ẞ LATIN CAPITAL LETTER SHARP S, U+00DF ß LATIN SMALL LETTER SHARP S	&szlig;
st	ﬆ	U+FB06 ﬆ LATIN SMALL LIGATURE ST	
ſt, ft	ﬅ	U+FB05 ﬅ LATIN SMALL LIGATURE LONG S T	
struck-through th	ᵺ	U+1D70 ᵰ LATIN SMALL LETTER N WITH MIDDLE TILDE	
ʈh	𝽣	U+1DF63 𝽣 LATIN SMALL LETTER STRETCHED T-H DIGRAPH	
reversed th	𝽤	U+1DF64 𝽤 LATIN SMALL LETTER REVERSED T-H DIGRAPH	
TZ, tz	Ꜩ, ꜩ	U+A728 Ꜩ LATIN CAPITAL LETTER TZ, U+A729 ꜩ LATIN SMALL LETTER TZ	
ue	ᵫ	U+1D6B ᵫ LATIN SMALL LETTER UE	
uo	ꭣ	U+AB63 ꭣ LATIN SMALL LETTER UO	
VV, vv	W, w	U+0057 W LATIN CAPITAL LETTER W, U+0077 w LATIN SMALL LETTER W	
VY, vy	Ꝡ, ꝡ	U+A760 Ꝡ LATIN CAPITAL LETTER VY, U+A761 ꝡ LATIN SMALL LETTER VY	
wh	𝽥	U+1DF65 𝽥 LATIN SMALL LETTER WH DIGRAPH	
ǷǷ, ƿƿ	꟔, ꟕ	U+A7D4 ꟔ LATIN CAPITAL LETTER DOUBLE WYNN, U+A7D5 ꟕ LATIN SMALL LETTER DOUBLE WYNN	
ÞT, þt	Ꝥ, ꝥ	U+A764 Ꝥ LATIN CAPITAL LETTER THORN WITH STROKE, U+A765 ꝥ LATIN SMALL LETTER THORN WITH STROKE	
ÞÞ, þþ	꟒, ꟓ	U+A7D2 ꟒ LATIN CAPITAL LETTER DOUBLE THORN, U+A7D3 ꟓ LATIN SMALL LETTER DOUBLE THORN	

There are separate code points for the digraph DZ, the Dutch digraph IJ, and for the Serbo-Croatian digraphs DŽ, LJ, and NJ. Although similar, these are digraphs, not ligatures. See Digraphs in Unicode.

==== Ligatures used only in phonetic transcription ====
Non-ligature	Ligature	Unicode
superscript ᴀᴀ	𐞀	U+10780 𐞀 MODIFIER LETTER SMALL CAPITAL AA
superscript ae	𐞃	U+10783 𐞃 MODIFIER LETTER SMALL AE
aə	ꬱ	U+AB31 ꬱ LATIN SMALL LETTER A REVERSED-SCHWA
əø	ꭁ	U+AB41 ꭁ LATIN SMALL LETTER TURNED OE WITH STROKE
db (Note: Unicode calls this a digraph, but it is actually a ligature.)	ȸ	U+0238 ȸ LATIN SMALL LETTER DB DIGRAPH
dz	ʣ	U+02A3 ʣ LATIN SMALL LETTER DZ DIGRAPH
dʐ	ꭦ	U+AB66 ꭦ LATIN SMALL LETTER DZ DIGRAPH WITH RETROFLEX HOOK
dʑ	ʥ	U+02A5 ʥ LATIN SMALL LETTER DZ DIGRAPH WITH CURL
dʒ	ʤ	U+02A4 ʤ LATIN SMALL LETTER DEZH DIGRAPH
d𝼘	𝼒	U+1DF12 𝼒 LATIN SMALL LETTER DEZH DIGRAPH WITH PALATAL HOOK
dᶚ	𝼙	U+1DF19 𝼙 LATIN SMALL LETTER DEZH DIGRAPH WITH RETROFLEX HOOK
fŋ	ʩ	U+02A9 ʩ LATIN SMALL LETTER FENG DIGRAPH
superscript fŋ	𐞐	U+10790 𐞐 MODIFIER LETTER SMALL FENG DIGRAPH
trilled fŋ	𝼀	U+1DF00 𝼀 LATIN SMALL LETTER FENG DIGRAPH WITH TRILL
ls	ʪ	U+02AA ʪ LATIN SMALL LETTER LS DIGRAPH
superscript ls	𐞙	U+10799 𐞙 MODIFIER LETTER SMALL LS DIGRAPH
lz	ʫ	U+02AB ʫ LATIN SMALL LETTER LZ DIGRAPH
superscript lz	𐞚	U+1079A 𐞚 MODIFIER LETTER SMALL LZ DIGRAPH
lʒ	ɮ	U+026E ɮ LATIN SMALL LETTER LEZH
superscript lʒ	𐞞	U+1079E 𐞞 MODIFIER LETTER SMALL LEZH
lᶚ	𝼅	U+1DF05 𝼅 LATIN SMALL LETTER LEZH WITH RETROFLEX HOOK
superscript lᶚ	𐞟	U+1079F 𐞟 MODIFIER LETTER SMALL LEZH WITH RETROFLEX HOOK
oə	ꭀ	U+AB40 ꭀ LATIN SMALL LETTER INVERTED OE
qp	ȹ	U+0239 ȹ LATIN SMALL LETTER QP DIGRAPH
tc, tɕ	ʨ	U+02A8 ʨ LATIN SMALL LETTER TC DIGRAPH WITH CURL
superscript tɕ, superscript tc	𐞫	U+107AB 𐞫 MODIFIER LETTER SMALL TC DIGRAPH WITH CURL
ts	ʦ	U+02A6 ʦ LATIN SMALL LETTER TS DIGRAPH
superscript ts	𐞬	U+107AC 𐞬 MODIFIER LETTER SMALL TS DIGRAPH
tʂ	ꭧ	U+AB67 ꭧ LATIN SMALL LETTER TS DIGRAPH WITH RETROFLEX HOOK
superscript tʂ	𐞭	U+107AD 𐞭 MODIFIER LETTER SMALL TS DIGRAPH WITH RETROFLEX HOOK
tʂ	ꭧ	U+AB67 ꭧ LATIN SMALL LETTER TS DIGRAPH WITH RETROFLEX HOOK
tʃ, tſ	ʧ	U+02A7 ʧ LATIN SMALL LETTER TESH DIGRAPH
superscript tʃ	𐞮	U+107AE 𐞮 MODIFIER LETTER SMALL TESH DIGRAPH
tᶘ	𝼜	U+1DF1C 𝼜 LATIN SMALL LETTER TESH DIGRAPH WITH RETROFLEX HOOK
tᶋ	𝼗	U+1DF17 𝼗 LATIN SMALL LETTER TESH DIGRAPH WITH PALATAL HOOK
ui	ꭐ	U+AB50 ꭐ LATIN SMALL LETTER UI
turned ui	ꭑ	U+AB51 ꭑ LATIN SMALL LETTER TURNED UI
uu	ɯ	U+026F ɯ LATIN SMALL LETTER TURNED M

Four "ligature ornaments" are included from U+1F670–U+1F673 in the Ornamental Dingbats block: regular and bold variants of ℯT (script e and T) and of ɛT (open E and T).

== Contemporary art ==
"" an example of Xu Bing's 'Square Word' calligraphy, combining Latin characters into forms that resemble Chinese characters. The word pictured is 'wiki'.

Typographic ligatures are used in a form of contemporary art, as can be illustrated by Chinese artist Xu Bing's work in which he combines Latin letters to form characters that resemble Chinese. Croatian designer Maja Škripelj also created a ligature that combined the Glagolitic letters ⰘⰓ for euro coins.

== See also ==
- Complex text layout – Neighbour-dependent grapheme positioning
- Digraph (orthography) – Pair of characters used to write one phoneme (the unfused pairing of graphemes)
- Greek ligatures – Ligatures used in Greek writing
- Kerning – Process in typography (optimization of spacing between adjacent letters).
- Letter spacing – Physical spacing of characters in text
- List of English words that may be spelled with a ligature
- Monogram – Motif made by overlapping two or more letters
- Scribal abbreviation – Abbreviations used by ancient and medieval scribes
- Text shaping – Process of converting text to glyph indices and positions
- Unicode equivalence – Aspect of the Unicode standard
