= Yo (kana) =

yo

Hiragana	Katakana
- Transliteration: yo
- Hiragana origin: 与
- Katakana origin: 與
- Man'yōgana: 用 容 欲 夜 与 余 四 世 代 吉
- Spelling kana: 吉野のヨ Yoshino no "yo"
- Unicode: U+3088, U+30E8
- Braille: ⠜
- Note: These Man'yōgana originally represented morae with one of two different vowel sounds, which merged in later pronunciation

Yo (hiragana: よ, katakana: ヨ) is one of the Japanese kana, each of which represents one mora. The hiragana is made in two strokes, while the katakana in three. Both represent [jo].

When small and preceded by an -i kana, this kana represents a palatalization of the preceding consonant sound with the [o] vowel (see yōon).

In mathematics, よ is sometimes used to represent the Yoneda embedding.

Forms	Rōmaji	Hiragana	Katakana
Normal y- (や行 ya-gyō)	yo	よ	ヨ
Normal y- (や行 ya-gyō)	you yoo yō	よう, よぅ よお, よぉ よー	ヨウ, ヨゥ ヨオ, ヨォ ヨー

== Stroke order ==
Stroke order in writing よ

Stroke order in writing ヨ

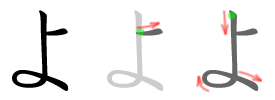
Stroke order in writing よ

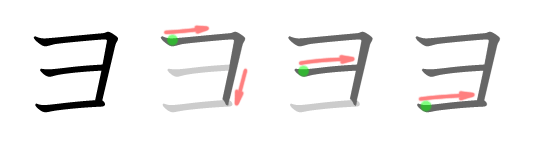
Stroke order in writing ヨ

== Other communicative representations ==
Japanese radiotelephony alphabet	Wabun code
吉野のヨ; Yoshino no "Yo"	▄▄▄ ▄▄▄

Japanese Navy Signal Flag

Japanese semaphore
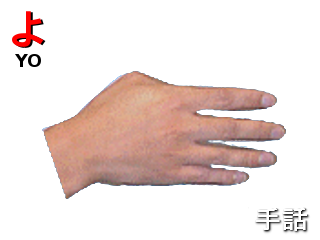
Japanese manual syllabary (fingerspelling)
Braille dots-345
Japanese Braille

=== Braille forms ===
よ / ヨ in Japanese Braille
よ / ヨ yo	よう / ヨー yō	ょ/ョ; Yōon*	゛ょ/゛ョ; Dakuten + Yōon*	゜ょ/゜ョ; Handakuten + Yōon*
⠜ (braille pattern dots-345)	⠜ (braille pattern dots-345) ⠒ (braille pattern dots-25)	⠈ (braille pattern dots-4)	⠘ (braille pattern dots-45)	⠨ (braille pattern dots-46)

* The yōon characters ょ and ョ are encoded in Japanese Braille by prefixing "-o" kana (e.g. Ko, So) with a yōon braille indicator, which can be combined with the "Dakuten" or "Handakuten" braille indicators for the appropriate consonant sounds.

=== Computer encodings ===
Character information
Preview	よ		ヨ		ﾖ		㋵	
Unicode name	HIRAGANA LETTER YO		KATAKANA LETTER YO		HALFWIDTH KATAKANA LETTER YO		CIRCLED KATAKANA YO	
Encodings	decimal	hex	dec	hex	dec	hex	dec	hex
Unicode	12424	U+3088	12520	U+30E8	65430	U+FF96	13045	U+32F5
UTF-8	227 130 136	E3 82 88	227 131 168	E3 83 A8	239 190 150	EF BE 96	227 139 181	E3 8B B5
Numeric character reference	&#12424;	&#x3088;	&#12520;	&#x30E8;	&#65430;	&#xFF96;	&#13045;	&#x32F5;
Shift JIS	130 230	82 E6	131 136	83 88	214	D6		
EUC-JP	164 232	A4 E8	165 232	A5 E8	142 214	8E D6		
GB 18030	164 232	A4 E8	165 232	A5 E8	132 49 155 48	84 31 9B 30		
EUC-KR / UHC	170 232	AA E8	171 232	AB E8				
Big5 (non-ETEN kana)	198 236	C6 EC	199 162	C7 A2				
Big5 (ETEN / HKSCS)	199 111	C7 6F	199 228	C7 E4				

Character information
Preview	ょ		ョ		ｮ	
Unicode name	HIRAGANA LETTER SMALL YO		KATAKANA LETTER SMALL YO		HALFWIDTH KATAKANA LETTER SMALL YO	
Encodings	decimal	hex	dec	hex	dec	hex
Unicode	12423	U+3087	12519	U+30E7	65390	U+FF6E
UTF-8	227 130 135	E3 82 87	227 131 167	E3 83 A7	239 189 174	EF BD AE
Numeric character reference	&#12423;	&#x3087;	&#12519;	&#x30E7;	&#65390;	&#xFF6E;
Shift JIS	130 229	82 E5	131 135	83 87	174	AE
EUC-JP	164 231	A4 E7	165 231	A5 E7	142 174	8E AE
GB 18030	164 231	A4 E7	165 231	A5 E7	132 49 151 48	84 31 97 30
EUC-KR / UHC	170 231	AA E7	171 231	AB E7		
Big5 (non-ETEN kana)	198 235	C6 EB	199 161	C7 A1		
Big5 (ETEN/> / HKSCS)	199 110	C7 6E	199 227	C7 E3		

== See also ==
- Yori (kana)
