= Koto (kana) =

koto

Hiragana	Katakana
- Transliteration: koto
- Hiragana origin: こと
- Katakana origin: 事

Koto (hiragana:, katakana: ヿ) is one of the Japanese kana. It is a polysyllabic kana which represents two morae. Both the hiragana and katakana forms represent [koto]. is a combination (ligature) of the hiragana graphs of ko (こ) and to (と), while ヿ originates from the Chinese character 事.

The katakana koto is as a shorthand used in shinkatakana (真片仮名) (an obsolete writing style that exclusively used katakana instead of hiragana).

== In Unicode ==
Character information
Preview	𛄣		ヿ	
Unicode name	HIRAGANA DIGRAPH KOTO		KATAKANA DIGRAPH KOTO	
Encodings	decimal	hex	dec	hex
Unicode	110883	U+1B123	12543	U+30FF
UTF-8	240 155 132 163	F0 9B 84 A3	227 131 191	E3 83 BF
UTF-16	55340 56611	D82C DD23	12543	30FF
Numeric character reference	&#110883;	&#x1B123;	&#12543;	&#x30FF;
JIS X 0213			34 56	22 38

== See also ==
- Ko (kana)
- To (kana)
- Yori (kana)
- Katakana
