= Kana ligature =

Ligatures in the kana writing system

In the Japanese writing system, kana ligatures (Japanese: 合略仮名, Hepburn: gōryaku-gana) are ligatures in the kana writing system, both hiragana and katakana. Kana such as koto (ヿ; from 事) and shite (𬼀; from 為) are not kana ligatures, but polysyllabic kana. Most of such ligatures and polysyllabic kanas became obsolete.

== History ==
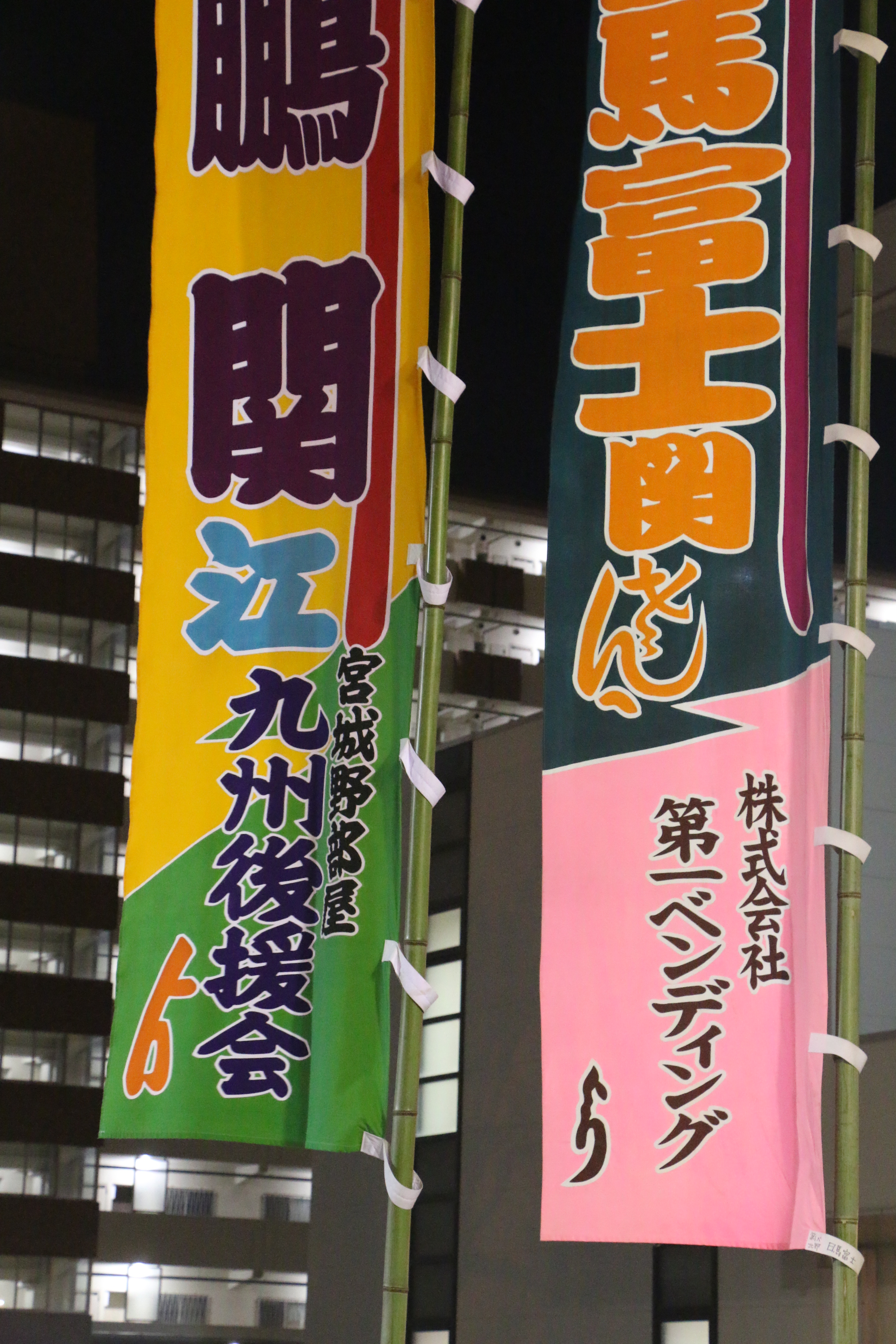
Nobori banners in sumo, using the yori ligature ゟ

These characters were widely used until a spelling reform decreed that each sound (mora) would be represented by one (kana) character. In January 1900, the Kana Investigation Committee (仮名調査委員) passed a resolution to "limit the number of homophone kana characters to one each" and aimed to abolish hentaigana, iteration marks, long-vowel marks, jionkanazukai, the characters ゐ/ヰ (wi) and ゑ/ヱ (we), as well as the ligatures and the polysyllabic kanas.

Kana ligatures such as (toki), (koto), etc., were actively used in Japan during the Edo and Meiji periods. These ligatures were sometimes placed together along with the hiragana and katakana syllabaries in Japanese school textbooks. Nowadays, these ligatures are obsolete and are not taught at schools anymore.

=== Encoding standards ===
讀方入門 (yomikata nyūmon), a school textbook in which (koto) and (toki) can be seen listed among the other kanas

These ligatures were not represented in computer character encodings until JIS X 0213:2000 (JIS2000) added ゟ (yori) and ヿ (koto). In 2002, ヿ and ゟ were added to Unicode 3.2. In October 2009, 𪜈 (tomo) was added to Unicode 5.2 in the CJK Unified Ideographs Extension C block. In June 2017, 𬼀 (shite), 𬼂 (nari), and 𬻿 (nari) were added to Unicode 10.0 in the CJK Unified Ideographs Extension F block. In September 2026, Unicode 18.0 added 𛄣 (koto), 𛄤 (toki), 𛄥 (tote) and 𛄦 (yori) to the Kana Extended-A block, encoded as kana rather than as ideographs; the proposals also covered kashiko, sama, mairasesōrō and to-iu, which were dropped before encoding.

== List ==
=== Hiragana ligature ===
Historical/Hepburn	Image	Character	Unicode	Origin
かしこ/kashiko		—N/a	—N/a	𛀚しこ
こと/koto		𛄣	U+1B123	こと
ごと/goto	゙	𛄣゙	U+1B123	ごと
さま/sama		—N/a	—N/a	さ𛃅
さま/sama		—N/a	—N/a	さ𛃅
まゐらせさうらふ/mairasesōrō		—N/a	—N/a	参らせ候ふ
まゐらせさうらふ/mairasesōrō		—N/a	—N/a	参らせ候ふ
より/yori		ゟ	U+309F	より

=== Polysyllabic hiragana ===
Historical/Hepburn	Image	Character	Unicode	Origin
なり/nari		𬼂	U+2CF02	也

=== Katakana ligature ===
Historical/Hepburn	Image	Character	Unicode	Origin
トイフ/toyū		—N/a	—N/a	ト云
トキ/toki		𛄤	U+1B124	トキ
トテ/tote		𛄥	U+1B125	トテ
トモ/tomo		𪜈	U+2A708	トモ
ドモ/domo		𪜈゙	U+2A708	ドモ
ヨリ/yori		𛄦	U+1B126	ヨリ

=== Polysyllabic katakana ===
Historical/Hepburn	Image	Character	Unicode	Origin
イフ/yū		—N/a	—N/a	云
コト/koto		ヿ	U+30FF	事
シテ/shite		𬼀	U+2CF00	為
トキ/toki		—N/a	—N/a	時
ナリ/nari		𬻿	U+2CEFF	也

== In Unicode ==
Character information
Preview																				
Unicode name	HIRAGANA DIGRAPH YORI		KATAKANA DIGRAPH KOTO		HIRAGANA DIGRAPH KOTO		KATAKANA DIGRAPH TOKI		KATAKANA DIGRAPH TOTE		KATAKANA DIGRAPH YORI		CJK UNIFIED IDEOGRAPH-2A708		CJK UNIFIED IDEOGRAPH-2CEFF		CJK UNIFIED IDEOGRAPH-2CF00		CJK UNIFIED IDEOGRAPH-2CF02	
Encodings	decimal	hex	dec	hex	dec	hex	dec	hex	dec	hex	dec	hex	dec	hex	dec	hex	dec	hex	dec	hex
Unicode	12447	U+309F	12543	U+30FF	110883	U+1B123	110884	U+1B124	110885	U+1B125	110886	U+1B126	173832	U+2A708	184063	U+2CEFF	184064	U+2CF00	184066	U+2CF02
UTF-8	227 130 159	E3 82 9F	227 131 191	E3 83 BF	240 155 132 163	F0 9B 84 A3	240 155 132 164	F0 9B 84 A4	240 155 132 165	F0 9B 84 A5	240 155 132 166	F0 9B 84 A6	240 170 156 136	F0 AA 9C 88	240 172 187 191	F0 AC BB BF	240 172 188 128	F0 AC BC 80	240 172 188 130	F0 AC BC 82
UTF-16	12447	309F	12543	30FF	55340 56611	D82C DD23	55340 56612	D82C DD24	55340 56613	D82C DD25	55340 56614	D82C DD26	55401 57096	D869 DF08	55411 57087	D873 DEFF	55411 57088	D873 DF00	55411 57090	D873 DF02
Numeric character reference	&#12447;	&#x309F;	&#12543;	&#x30FF;	&#110883;	&#x1B123;	&#110884;	&#x1B124;	&#110885;	&#x1B125;	&#110886;	&#x1B126;	&#173832;	&#x2A708;	&#184063;	&#x2CEFF;	&#184064;	&#x2CF00;	&#184066;	&#x2CF02;

== See also ==
- Japanese rebus monogram
