= Uni (letter) =

23rd letter of the three Georgian scripts

- Ⴓ ⴓ უ Უ

Usage
- Writing system: Georgian script
- Type: Alphabetic
- Language of origin: Georgian language
- Sound values: [u], [y]
- In Unicode: U+10B3, U+2D13, U+10E3, U+1CA3
- Alphabetical position: 23

History
- Development: ႭჃ: ⴍⴣ; ⴓ; Ⴓ ⴓ უ Უ
- Time period: c. 430 to present
- Transliterations: U

Other
- Associated numbers: 400
- Writing direction: Left-to-right

Uni, or Un (Asomtavruli: ႭჃ, later Ⴓ; Nuskhuri: ⴍⴣ, later ⴓ; Mkhedruli: უ or; Mtavruli: Უ; Georgian: უნი, უნ) is the 23rd letter of the three Georgian scripts.

In the system of Georgian numerals, it has a value of 400 as letter Vie. Uni commonly represents the close back rounded vowel /u/, like the pronunciation of ⟨oo⟩ in "boot". In the Svan language, Uni also represents the close front rounded vowel /y/. It is typically romanized with the letter U.

An additional mkhedruli uni letters, უ̈ with an umlaut, უ̄ with a macron, უ̄̈ with both umlaut and macron, and უ̂ with a circumflex are used in Svan language.

== Letter ==
asomtavruli	nuskhuri	mkhedruli		mtavruli
asomtavruli	nuskhuri	standard	alternative	mtavruli
(digraph) (ligature)	(digraph) (ligature)			

=== Three-dimensional ===
asomtavruli

nuskhuri

mkhedruli

=== Stroke order ===
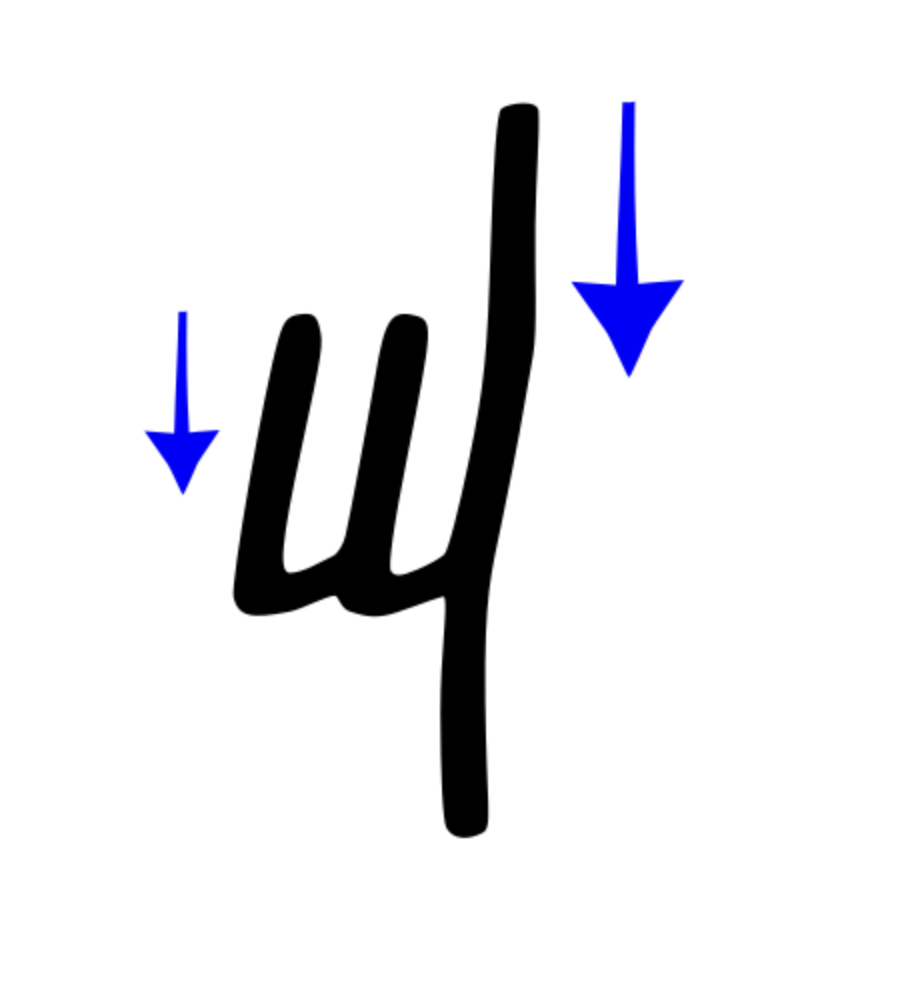
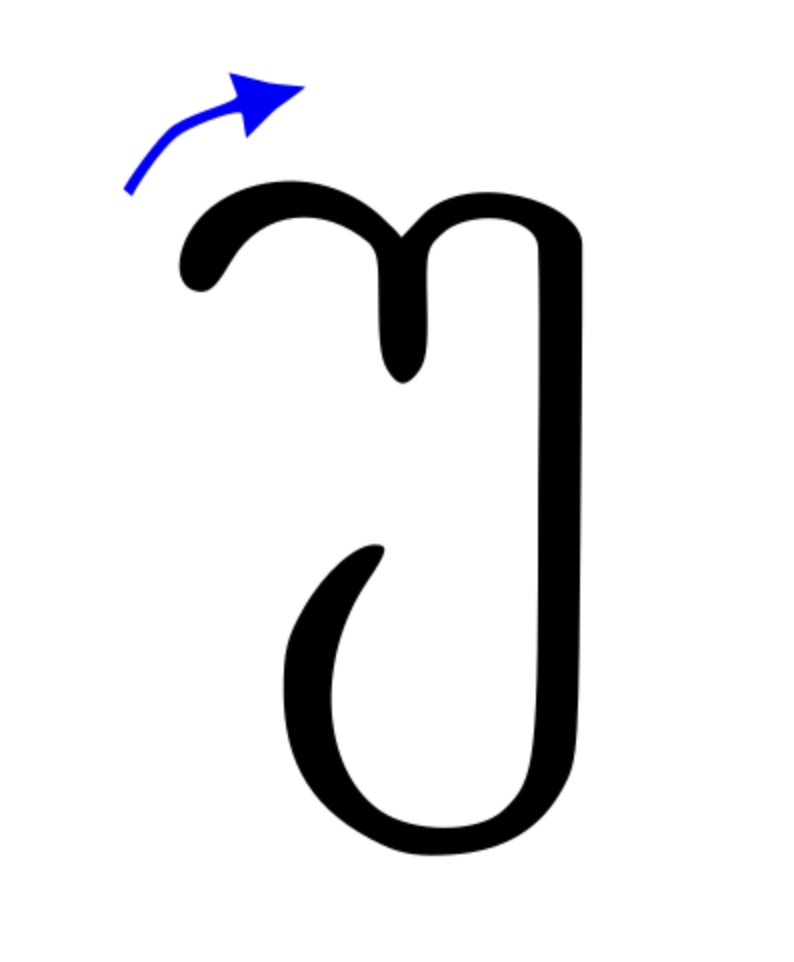
asomtavruli	nuskhuri	mkhedruli
asomtavruli	nuskhuri	standard	alternative

== Computer encodings ==
Character information
Preview	Ⴓ		ⴓ		უ		Უ	
Unicode name	GEORGIAN CAPITAL LETTER UN		GEORGIAN SMALL LETTER UN		GEORGIAN LETTER UN		GEORGIAN MTAVRULI CAPITAL LETTER UN	
Encodings	decimal	hex	dec	hex	dec	hex	dec	hex
Unicode	4275	U+10B3	11539	U+2D13	4323	U+10E3	7331	U+1CA3
UTF-8	225 130 179	E1 82 B3	226 180 147	E2 B4 93	225 131 163	E1 83 A3	225 178 163	E1 B2 A3
Numeric character reference	&#4275;	&#x10B3;	&#11539;	&#x2D13;	&#4323;	&#x10E3;	&#7331;	&#x1CA3;

== With diacritic ==
უ̈	უ̄	უ̄̈	უ̂
U+10E3 U+0308	U+10E3 U+0304	U+10E3 U+0304 U+0308	U+10E3 U+0302

== Braille ==
mkhedruli

== See also ==
- Latin letter U
- Cyrillic letter U
- Georgian letter Oni
- Georgian letter Vie
- Georgian letter Vini

== Bibliography ==
- Mchedlidze, T. (1) The restored Georgian alphabet, Fulda, Germany, 2013
- Mchedlidze, T. (2) The Georgian script; Dictionary and guide, Fulda, Germany, 2013
- Machavariani, E. Georgian manuscripts, Tbilisi, 2011
- The Unicode Standard, Version 6.3, (1) Georgian, 1991-2013
- The Unicode Standard, Version 6.3, (2) Georgian Supplement, 1991-2013
