= Yori (kana) =

Japanese ligature

yori

Hiragana	Katakana
- Transliteration: yori
- Hiragana origin: より
- Katakana origin: ヨリ

Yori (hiragana: ゟ, katakana:) is one of the Japanese kana. It is a polysyllabic kana which represents two morae. Both the hiragana and katakana forms represent [joɾi] "from". ゟ is a combination (ligature) of the hiragana graphs of yo (よ) and ri (り), while is a combination (ligature) of the katakana graphs of yo (ヨ) and ri (リ).

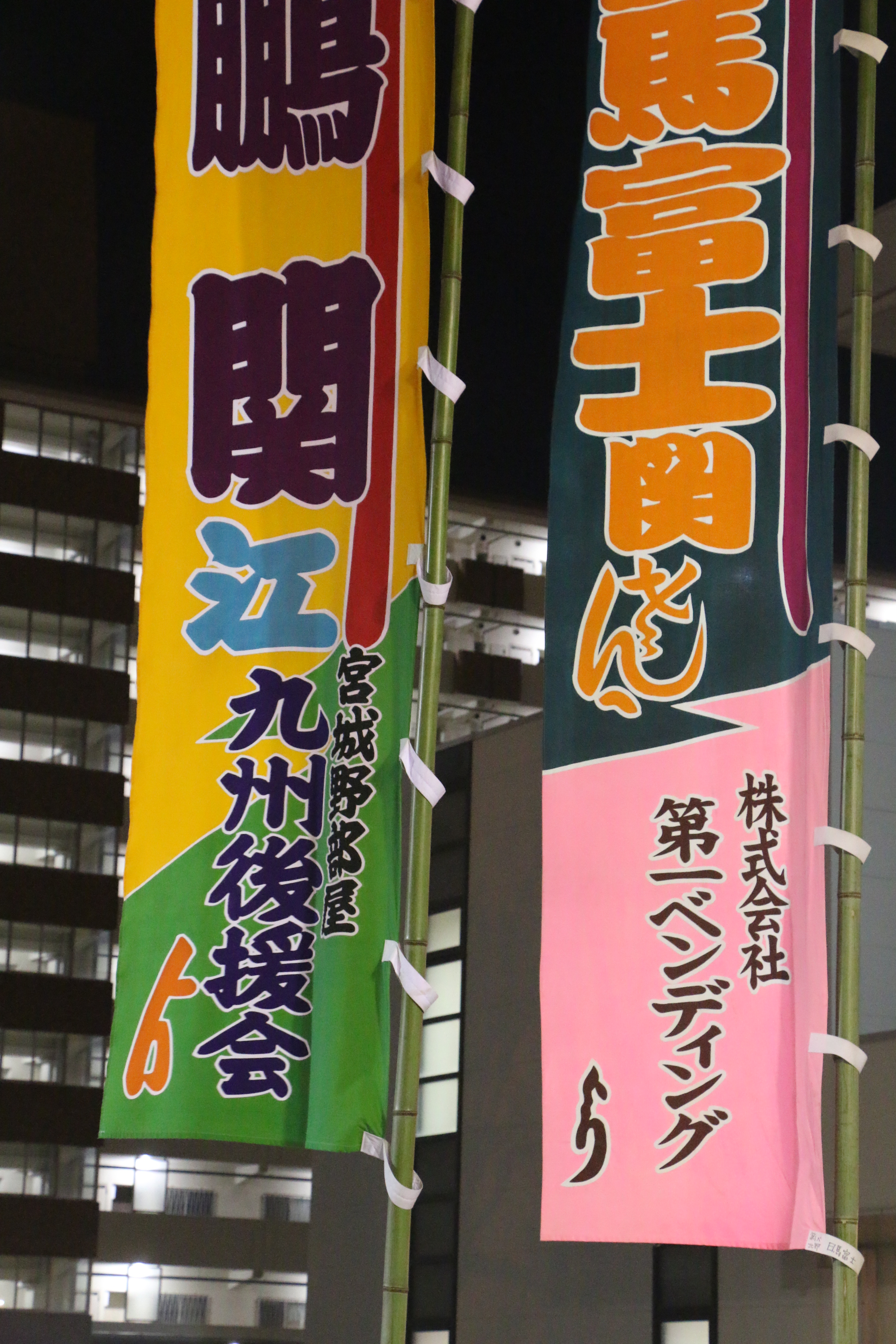
Nobori in sumo (2016)

== In Unicode ==
Character information
Preview	ゟ		𛄦	
Unicode name	HIRAGANA DIGRAPH YORI		KATAKANA DIGRAPH YORI	
Encodings	decimal	hex	dec	hex
Unicode	12447	U+309F	110886	U+1B126
UTF-8	227 130 159	E3 82 9F	240 155 132 166	F0 9B 84 A6
UTF-16	12447	309F	55340 56614	D82C DD26
Numeric character reference	&#12447;	&#x309F;	&#110886;	&#x1B126;
JIS X 0213	34 57	22 39		

== See also ==
- Yo (kana)
- Ri (kana)
- Koto (kana)
- Katakana
