= Mu (kana) =

mu

Hiragana	Katakana
- Transliteration: mu
- Hiragana origin: 武
- Katakana origin: 牟
- Man'yōgana: 牟 武 無 模 務 謀 六
- Spelling kana: 無線のム Musen no "mu"
- Unicode: U+3080, U+30E0
- Braille: ⠽

Mu (hiragana: む, katakana: ム) is one of the Japanese kana, which each represent one mora. The hiragana is written with three strokes, while the katakana is written with two. Both represent [mɯ].

In older Japanese texts until the spelling reforms of 1900, む was also used to transcribe the nasalized [ɴ]. Since the reforms, it is replaced in such positions with ん.

In the Ainu language, ム can be written as small ㇺ, which represents a final m sound. This, along with other extended katakana, was developed by Japanese linguists to represent Ainu sounds that do not exist in standard Japanese katakana.

Form	Rōmaji	Hiragana	Katakana
Normal m- (ま行 ma-gyō)	mu	む	ム
Normal m- (ま行 ma-gyō)	muu, mwu mū	むう, むぅ むー	ムウ, ムゥ ムー

Other additional forms

Form (mw-)
Rōmaji	Hiragana	Katakana
mwa	むぁ, むゎ	ムァ, ムヮ
mwi	むぃ	ムィ
(mwu)	(むぅ)	(ムゥ)
mwe	むぇ	ムェ
mwo	むぉ	ムォ

== Stroke order ==
Stroke order in writing む

Stroke order in writing ム

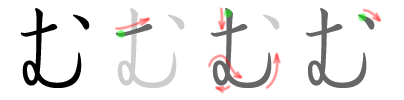
Stroke order in writing む

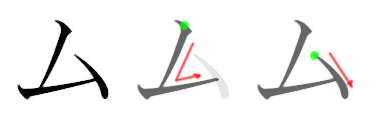
Stroke order in writing ム

== Other communicative representations ==
Japanese radiotelephony alphabet	Wabun code
無線のム; Musen no "Mu"	▄▄▄

Japanese Navy Signal Flag

Japanese semaphore
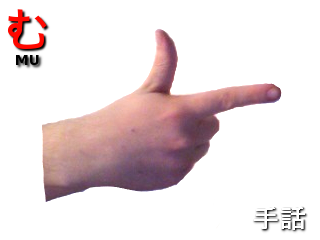
Japanese manual syllabary (fingerspelling)
Braille dots-13456
Japanese Braille

=== Braille forms ===
む / ム in Japanese Braille
む / ム mu	むう / ムー mū	Other kana based on Braille む	
む / ム mu	むう / ムー mū	みゅ / ミュ myu	みゅう / ミュー myū
⠽ (braille pattern dots-13456)	⠽ (braille pattern dots-13456) ⠒ (braille pattern dots-25)	⠈ (braille pattern dots-4) ⠽ (braille pattern dots-13456)	⠈ (braille pattern dots-4) ⠽ (braille pattern dots-13456) ⠒ (braille pattern dots-25)

=== Character encodings ===
Character information
Preview	む		ム		ﾑ		ㇺ		㋰	
Unicode name	HIRAGANA LETTER MU		KATAKANA LETTER MU		HALFWIDTH KATAKANA LETTER MU		KATAKANA LETTER SMALL MU		CIRCLED KATAKANA MU	
Encodings	decimal	hex	dec	hex	dec	hex	dec	hex	dec	hex
Unicode	12416	U+3080	12512	U+30E0	65425	U+FF91	12794	U+31FA	13040	U+32F0
UTF-8	227 130 128	E3 82 80	227 131 160	E3 83 A0	239 190 145	EF BE 91	227 135 186	E3 87 BA	227 139 176	E3 8B B0
Numeric character reference	&#12416;	&#x3080;	&#12512;	&#x30E0;	&#65425;	&#xFF91;	&#12794;	&#x31FA;	&#13040;	&#x32F0;
Shift JIS (plain)	130 222	82 DE	131 128	83 80	209	D1				
Shift JIS-2004	130 222	82 DE	131 128	83 80	209	D1	131 247	83 F7		
EUC-JP (plain)	164 224	A4 E0	165 224	A5 E0	142 209	8E D1				
EUC-JIS-2004	164 224	A4 E0	165 224	A5 E0	142 209	8E D1	166 249	A6 F9		
GB 18030	164 224	A4 E0	165 224	A5 E0	132 49 154 53	84 31 9A 35	129 57 189 52	81 39 BD 34		
EUC-KR / UHC	170 224	AA E0	171 224	AB E0						
Big5 (non-ETEN kana)	198 228	C6 E4	199 120	C7 78						
Big5 (ETEN / HKSCS)	199 103	C7 67	199 220	C7 DC						

== See also ==
- 厶 (Radical 28)
