= Man'yōgana =

System of writing Japanese based solely on Chinese characters

Man'yōgana 万葉仮名
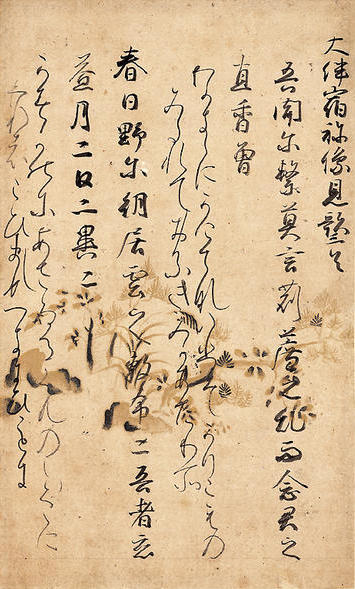
- A page from Katsura-bon Man'yōshū with poems written with man'yōgana and accompanied by hiragana transcription.
- Script type: Syllabary
- Period: c. 650 CE to Meiji era
- Direction: Vertical writing
- Languages: Japanese and Okinawan

Related scripts
- Parent systems: Oracle bone script: Seal script; Clerical script; Regular script; Man'yōgana
- Child systems: Hiragana, Katakana
- Sister systems: Contemporary kanji

Man'yōgana (万葉仮名; Japanese pronunciation: [maɰ̃joꜜːɡana] or [maɰ̃joːɡana]) is an ancient Japanese writing system that uses Chinese characters to phonetically represent Old Japanese. It was the first known kana system to be developed as a means to phonetically transcribe the Japanese language. Dating of the earliest man'yōgana usage is not clear, but it was in use at least since the mid-7th century, during the Nara period. The name derives from Man'yōshū, a Japanese poetry anthology written in man'yōgana, which was compiled after 759 AD.

Although Japanese texts have always used imported Chinese characters (kanji) logographically for semantic expressions, man'yōgana only borrows the characters' on'yomi pronunciations as an approximate syllabary to represent Japanese syllabuses. The phonetic values were derived from the Middle Chinese variants of Jianghuai Mandarin (i.e. the go-on pronunciations), but native Japanese readings (kun'yomi) of the character were also sometimes used. For example, 木 (whose character means 'tree') could represent /mo/ (based on Middle Chinese /*məwk/), /ko/, or /kwi/ (meaning 'tree' in Old Japanese).

The complexity of learning and writing Chinese characters eventually gave rise to simplified versions of man'yōgana, namely the hiragana (derived from cursive calligraphy) and the katakana (derived from Chinese character components), both of which are used extensively in Modern Japanese alongside a set of 2,136 commonly used kanji.

== Origin ==
Sinicized scholars from the Korean kingdom of Baekje are believed to have introduced the Chinese writing system to the Japanese archipelago, as the chronicles Kojiki and the Nihon Shoki, both written in Classic Chinese, have both stated so. Although direct evidence of this is hard to come by, scholars tend to accept the idea.

A possible oldest example of man'yōgana is the Inariyama Sword, a 5th-6th century iron sword from the Kofun period that was excavated at the Inariyama Kofun in 1968. In 1978, X-ray analysis revealed a gold-inlaid inscription consisting of at least 115 Chinese characters, and this Chinese text included Japanese personal names, which were written for names in a phonetic language. This sword is thought to have been made in the year 辛亥年 (471 AD in the commonly accepted theory). There is a strong possibility that the inscription of the Inariyama Sword may be written in a version of the Chinese language used in Baekje.

== Principles ==
Man'yōgana uses kanji characters for their sounds, not their meanings. There was no standard system for choice of kanji, and different ones could be used to represent the same sound, with the choice made on the whims of the writer. By the end of the 8th century, 970 kanji were in use to represent the 90 morae of Japanese. For example, the Man'yōshū poem 17/4025 was written as follows:

Man'yōgana	之乎路可良	多太古要久礼婆	波久比能海	安佐奈藝思多理	船梶母我毛
Katakana	シオジカラ	タダコエクレバ	ハクイノウミ	アサナギシタリ	フネカジモガモ
Modern	志雄路から	ただ越え来れば	羽咋の海	朝凪したり	船梶もがも
Romanized	Shioji kara	tada koe kureba	Hakui no umi	asanagi shitari	funekaji mogamo
Translation	From the Shiotsu road,	As I simply cross over,	The sea of Hakui	Is calm in the morning stillness.	Oh, if only I had a ship's rudder.

In the poem, the sounds mo (母, 毛) and shi (之, 思) are written with multiple, different characters. All particles and most words are represented phonetically (多太 tada, 安佐 asa), but the words ji (路), umi (海) and funekaji (船梶) are rendered semantically.

In some cases, specific syllables in particular words are consistently represented by specific characters. That usage is known as Jōdai Tokushu Kanazukai and usage has led historical linguists to conclude that certain disparate sounds in Old Japanese, consistently represented by differing sets of man'yōgana characters, may have merged since then.

== Types ==
In writing which utilizes man'yōgana, kanji are mapped to sounds in a number of different ways, some of which are straightforward and others which are less so.

Shakuon kana (借音仮名) are based on a Sino-Japanese on'yomi reading, in which one character represents either one mora or two morae.

Shakuon kana 借音仮名
Morae	1 character, complete	1 character, partial
1	以 (い) 呂 (ろ) 波 (は)	安 (あ) 樂 (ら) 天 (て)
2	信 (しな) 覧 (らむ) 相 (さが)	

Shakkun kana (借訓仮名) are based on a native kun'yomi reading, one to three characters represent one to three morae.

Shakkun kana 借訓仮名
Morae	1 character, complete	1 character, partial	2 characters	3 characters
1	女 (め) 毛 (け) 蚊 (か)	石 (し) 跡 (と) 市 (ち)	嗚呼 (あ) 五十 (い) 可愛 (え) 二二 (し) 蜂音 (ぶ)	
2	蟻 (あり) 卷 (まく) 鴨 (かも)			八十一 (くく) 神樂聲 (ささ)
3	慍 (いかり) 下 (おろし) 炊 (かしき)			

Table of man'yōgana one character represents one mora
	–	K	S	T	N	P	M	Y	R	W	G	Z	D	B
a	阿安英足鞅	可何加架香蚊迦	左佐沙作者柴紗草散	太多他丹駄田手立	那男奈南寧難七名魚菜	八方芳房半伴倍泊波婆破薄播幡羽早者速葉歯	萬末馬麻摩磨満前真間鬼	也移夜楊耶埜八矢屋	良浪郎樂羅等	和丸輪	我何賀	社射謝耶奢装蔵	陀太大嚢	伐婆磨魔
i_{1}	伊怡以異已移射五	氣支伎岐企棄寸吉杵來	子之芝水四司詞斯志思信偲寺侍時歌詩師紫新旨指次此死事准磯爲	知智陳千乳血茅	二貳人日仁爾儞邇尼泥耳柔丹荷似煮煎	比必卑賓日氷飯負嬪臂避匱	民彌美三參水見視御		里理利梨隣入煎	位爲謂井猪藍	伎祇藝岐儀蟻	自士仕司時尽慈耳餌兒貳爾	遅治地恥尼泥	婢鼻彌
i_{2}	伊怡以異已移射五	貴紀記奇寄忌幾木城	子之芝水四司詞斯志思信偲寺侍時歌詩師紫新旨指次此死事准磯爲	知智陳千乳血茅	二貳人日仁爾儞邇尼泥耳柔丹荷似煮煎	非悲斐火肥飛樋干乾彼被秘	未味尾微身実箕		里理利梨隣入煎	位爲謂井猪藍	疑宜義擬	自士仕司時尽慈耳餌兒貳爾	遅治地恥尼泥	備肥飛乾眉媚
u	宇羽汙于有卯鴉得	久九口壟苦鳩來	寸須周酒州洲珠數酢栖渚	都豆荳通追川津	奴努怒農濃沼宿	不否布負部敷経歴	牟武無模務謀六	由喩遊湯	留流類		具遇隅求愚虞	受授殊儒	豆荳頭弩	夫扶府文柔歩部
e_{1}	衣依愛榎	祁家計係價結鶏	世西斉勢施背脊迫瀬	堤天帝底手代直	禰尼泥年根宿	平反返弁弊陛遍覇部辺重隔	売馬面女	曳延要遙叡兄江吉枝衣	禮列例烈連	廻恵面咲	下牙雅夏	是湍	代田泥庭傳殿而涅提弟	弁便別部
e_{2}	衣依愛榎	氣既毛飼消	世西斉勢施背脊迫瀬	堤天帝底手代直	禰尼泥年根宿	閉倍陪拝戸経	梅米迷昧目眼海	曳延要遙叡兄江吉枝衣	禮列例烈連	廻恵面咲	義氣宜礙削	是湍	代田泥庭傳殿而涅提弟	倍毎
o_{1}	意憶於應	古姑枯故侯孤兒粉	宗祖素蘇十拾	刀土斗度戸利速	努怒農埜	凡方抱朋倍保宝富百帆穂本	毛畝蒙木問聞	用容欲夜	路漏	乎呼遠鳥怨越少小尾麻男緒雄	吾呉胡娯後籠兒悟誤	俗	土度渡奴怒	煩菩番蕃
o_{2}	意憶於應	己巨去居忌許虛興木	所則曾僧増憎衣背苑	止等登澄得騰十鳥常跡	乃能笑荷	凡方抱朋倍保宝富百帆穂本	方面忘母文茂記勿物望門喪裳藻	與余四世代吉	呂侶	乎呼遠鳥怨越少小尾麻男緒雄	其期碁語御馭凝	序叙賊存茹鋤	特藤騰等耐抒杼	煩菩番蕃

== Development ==
Due to the major differences between the Japanese language (which was polysyllabic) and the Chinese language (which was monosyllabic) from which kanji came, man'yōgana proved to be very cumbersome to read and write. As stated earlier, since kanji has two different sets of pronunciation, one based on Sino-Japanese pronunciation and the other on native Japanese pronunciation, it was difficult to determine whether a certain character was used to represent its pronunciation or its meaning, i.e., whether it was man'yōgana or actual kanji, or both. To alleviate the confusion and to save time writing, kanji that were used as man'yōgana eventually gave rise to hiragana, including the now-obsolete hentaigana (変体仮名) alternatives, alongside a separate system that became katakana. Hiragana developed from man'yōgana written in the highly cursive sōsho (草書) style popularly used by women; meanwhile, katakana was developed by Buddhist monks as a form of shorthand, utilizing, in most cases, only fragments (for example, usually the first or last few strokes) of man'yōgana characters. In some cases, one man'yōgana character for a given syllable gave rise to a hentaigana that was simplified further to result in the current hiragana character, while a different man'yōgana character was the source for the current katakana equivalent. For example, the hiragana る (ru) is derived from the man'yōgana 留, whereas the katakana ル (ru) is derived from the man'yōgana 流. The multiple alternative hiragana forms for a single syllable were ultimately standardized in 1900, and the rejected variants are now known as hentaigana.

Man'yōgana continues to appear in some regional names of present-day Japan, especially in Kyūshū. A phenomenon similar to man'yōgana, called ateji (当て字), still occurs, where words (including loanwords) are spelled out using kanji for their phonetic value. Examples include 倶楽部 (kurabu, "club"), 仏蘭西 (Furansu, France), 阿弗利加 (Afurika, Africa) and 亜米利加 (Amerika, America).

Katakana with man'yōgana equivalents (segments of man'yōgana adapted into katakana highlighted)

Katakana's man'yōgana including obsolete syllabograms Man'yōgana which are a common source for Hiragana and Katakana are highlighted
	–	K		S	T		N	H	M	Y	R	W
a	阿	加		散	多		奈	八	末	也	良	和
a	ア	カ		サ	タ		ナ	ハ	マ	ヤ	ラ	ワ
i	伊	機	幾	之	千		仁	比	三		利	井
i	イ	キ		シ	チ		ニ	ヒ	ミ		リ	ヰ
u	宇	久		須	州	川	奴	不	牟	由	流	
u	ウ	ク		ス	ツ		ヌ	フ	ム	ユ	ル	
e	江	介		世	天		祢	部	女	江	礼	恵
e	エ	ケ		セ	テ		ネ	ヘ	メ	エ	レ	ヱ
o	於	己		曽	止		乃	保	毛	與	呂	乎
o	オ	コ		ソ	ト		ノ	ホ	モ	ヨ	ロ	ヲ
–							尓					
–							ン					

Development of hiragana from man'yōgana

Hiragana's man'yōgana including obsolete syllabograms Man'yōgana which are a common source for Hiragana and Katakana are highlighted
	–	K		S	T	N	H	M	Y	R	W
a	安	加		左	太	奈	波	末	也	良	和
a	あ	か		さ	た	な	は	ま	や	ら	わ
i	以	機	幾	之	知	仁	比	美		利	爲
i	い	き		し	ち	に	ひ	み		り	ゐ
u	宇	久		寸	川	奴	不	武	由	留	
u	う	く		す	つ	ぬ	ふ	む	ゆ	る	
e	衣	計		世	天	祢	部	女	江	礼	恵
e	え	け		せ	て	ね	へ	め	𛀁	れ	ゑ
o	於	己		曽	止	乃	保	毛	与	呂	遠
o	お	こ		そ	と	の	ほ	も	よ	ろ	を
–						无					
–						ん					

== Example ==
The following example is from the second chapter of Nihon Shoki, one of two songs associated with the Emishi people written in Western Old Japanese.

比佐迦多能
ひさかたの
pîsa kata n-ö

阿麻遅波等保斯
あまぢはとほし
ama-N-ti pa töpo-si

奈保奈保爾
なほなほに
napo napo n-i

伊弊爾可弊利提
いへにかへりて
ipê-ni kapêr-i-te

奈利乎斯麻佐爾
なりをしまさに
nari-wo s-i-[i] mas-an-i

== See also ==
- Ateji
- Syllabogram
- Sōgana – Archaic Japanese syllabary
- Idu script, Korean analogue
