= So (kana) =

so

Hiragana	Katakana
- Transliteration: so
- Translit. with dakuten: zo
- Hiragana origin: 曽
- Katakana origin: 曽
- Man'yōgana: 宗 祖 素 蘇 十 所 則 曾 僧 増 憎 衣 背 苑
- Voiced man'yōgana: 俗 序 叙 賊 存 茹 鋤
- Spelling kana: そろばんのソ (Soroban no "so")
- Note: These Man'yōgana originally represented morae with one of two different vowel sounds, which merged in later pronunciation.

So (hiragana: そ, katakana: ソ) is one of the Japanese kana, each of which represents one mora. Both represent [so]. Besides the one-stroke form of this kana used by computer fonts, many native Japanese writers use a different form in handwriting, here listed as an alternative form.

Form	Rōmaji	Hiragana	Katakana
Normal s- (さ行 sa-gyō)	so	そ	ソ
Normal s- (さ行 sa-gyō)	sou soo sō	そう, そぅ そお, そぉ そー	ソウ, ソゥ ソオ, ソォ ソー
Addition dakuten z- (ざ行 za-gyō)	zo	ぞ	ゾ
Addition dakuten z- (ざ行 za-gyō)	zou zoo zō	ぞう, ぞぅ ぞお, ぞぉ ぞー	ゾウ, ゾゥ ゾオ, ゾォ ゾー

== Stroke order ==
Stroke order in writing そ

Stroke order in writing ソ

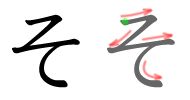
Stroke order in writing そ

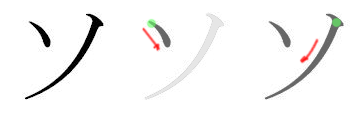
Stroke order in writing ソ

== Alternative forms ==
The kana so can have different shapes depending on the font or handwriting style. While the print so is written with one stroke, there is an alternative form typically drawn in two strokes, the top stroke disjointed from the rest of the kana and perpendicular to the start of the next stroke, although it can also be connected; any of these forms is considered acceptable. Although in the past Japanese elementary schools taught the two-stroke form, today the one-stroke print form is predominant among younger Japanese speakers and, to prevent confusion among elementary students still learning to write, is the form broadly taught by teachers in schools and used in textbooks today.

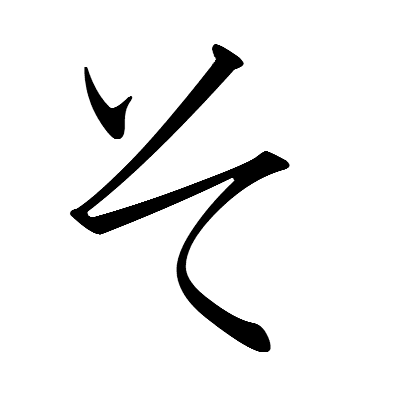
Alternate shape with the top stroke separated

Alternate blocky font shape

== Other communicative representations ==
Japanese radiotelephony alphabet	Wabun code
算盤のソ; Soroban no "So"	▄▄▄ ▄▄▄ ▄▄▄ ▄

Japanese Navy Signal Flag

Japanese semaphore
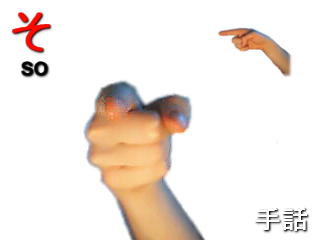
Japanese manual syllabary (fingerspelling)
Braille dots-2456
Japanese Braille

=== Braille forms ===
そ / ソ in Japanese Braille
そ / ソ so	ぞ / ゾ zo	そう / ソー sō	ぞう / ゾー zō	Other kana based on Braille そ			
そ / ソ so	ぞ / ゾ zo	そう / ソー sō	ぞう / ゾー zō	しょ / ショ sho	じょ / ジョ jo	しょう / ショー shō	じょう / ジョー jō
⠺ (braille pattern dots-2456)	⠐ (braille pattern dots-5) ⠺ (braille pattern dots-2456)	⠺ (braille pattern dots-2456) ⠒ (braille pattern dots-25)	⠐ (braille pattern dots-5) ⠺ (braille pattern dots-2456) ⠒ (braille pattern dots-25)	⠈ (braille pattern dots-4) ⠺ (braille pattern dots-2456)	⠘ (braille pattern dots-45) ⠺ (braille pattern dots-2456)	⠈ (braille pattern dots-4) ⠺ (braille pattern dots-2456) ⠒ (braille pattern dots-25)	⠘ (braille pattern dots-45) ⠺ (braille pattern dots-2456) ⠒ (braille pattern dots-25)

=== Computer encodings ===
Character information
Preview	そ		ソ		ｿ		ぞ		ゾ	
Unicode name	HIRAGANA LETTER SO		KATAKANA LETTER SO		HALFWIDTH KATAKANA LETTER SO		HIRAGANA LETTER ZO		KATAKANA LETTER ZO	
Encodings	decimal	hex	dec	hex	dec	hex	dec	hex	dec	hex
Unicode	12381	U+305D	12477	U+30BD	65407	U+FF7F	12382	U+305E	12478	U+30BE
UTF-8	227 129 157	E3 81 9D	227 130 189	E3 82 BD	239 189 191	EF BD BF	227 129 158	E3 81 9E	227 130 190	E3 82 BE
Numeric character reference	&#12381;	&#x305D;	&#12477;	&#x30BD;	&#65407;	&#xFF7F;	&#12382;	&#x305E;	&#12478;	&#x30BE;
Shift JIS	130 187	82 BB	131 92	83 5C	191	BF	130 188	82 BC	131 93	83 5D
EUC-JP	164 189	A4 BD	165 189	A5 BD	142 191	8E BF	164 190	A4 BE	165 190	A5 BE
GB 18030	164 189	A4 BD	165 189	A5 BD	132 49 152 55	84 31 98 37	164 190	A4 BE	165 190	A5 BE
EUC-KR / UHC	170 189	AA BD	171 189	AB BD			170 190	AA BE	171 190	AB BE
Big5 (non-ETEN kana)	198 193	C6 C1	199 85	C7 55			198 194	C6 C2	199 86	C7 56
Big5 (ETEN / HKSCS)	199 68	C7 44	199 185	C7 B9			199 69	C7 45	199 186	C7 BA

Character information
Preview	㋞	
Unicode name	CIRCLED KATAKANA SO	
Encodings	decimal	hex
Unicode	13022	U+32DE
UTF-8	227 139 158	E3 8B 9E
Numeric character reference	&#13022;	&#x32DE;
