= Ri (kana) =

ri

Hiragana	Katakana
- Transliteration: ri
- Hiragana origin: 利
- Katakana origin: 利
- Man'yōgana: 里 理 利 梨 隣 入 煎
- Spelling kana: りんごのリ Ringo no "ri"
- Unicode: U+308A, U+30EA
- Braille: ⠓

Ri (hiragana: り, katakana: リ) is one of the Japanese kana, each of which represents one mora. Both are written with two strokes and both represent the sound [ɾi]. Both originate from the character 利. The Ainu language uses a small katakana ㇼ to represent a final r sound after an i sound (イㇼ ir).

The hiragana character may also be written as a single stroke.

Form	Rōmaji	Hiragana	Katakana
Normal r- (ら行 ra-gyō)	ri	り	リ
Normal r- (ら行 ra-gyō)	rii, ryi rī	りい, りぃ りー	リイ, リィ リー
Addition yōon ry- (りゃ行 rya-gyō)	rya	りゃ	リャ
Addition yōon ry- (りゃ行 rya-gyō)	ryaa ryā	りゃあ, りゃぁ りゃー	リャア, リャァ リャー
Addition yōon ry- (りゃ行 rya-gyō)	ryu	りゅ	リュ
Addition yōon ry- (りゃ行 rya-gyō)	ryuu ryū	りゅう, りゅぅ りゅー	リュウ, リュゥ リュー
Addition yōon ry- (りゃ行 rya-gyō)	ryo	りょ	リョ
Addition yōon ry- (りゃ行 rya-gyō)	ryou ryoo ryō	りょう, りょぅ りょお, りょぉ りょー	リョウ, リョゥ リョオ, リョォ リョー

Other additional forms

Form (ry-)
Rōmaji	Hiragana	Katakana
(rya)	(りゃ)	(リャ)
(ryi)	(りぃ)	(リィ)
(ryu)	(りゅ)	(リュ)
rye ryei ryee ryē	りぇ りぇい, りぇぃ りぇえ りぇー	リェ リェイ, リェィ リェエ リェー
(ryo)	(りょ)	(リョ)

== Stroke order ==
Alternative writing of the ri hiragana with one stroke

Stroke order in writing り

1, 2

Stroke order in writing リ

2

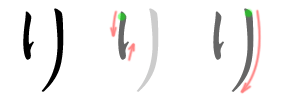
Stroke order in writing り

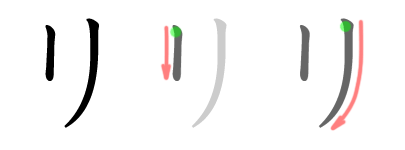
Stroke order in writing リ

== Other communicative representations ==
Japanese radiotelephony alphabet	Wabun code
りんごのリ; Ringo no "Ri"	▄▄▄ ▄▄▄ ▄

Japanese Navy Signal Flag

Japanese semaphore

Japanese manual syllabary (fingerspelling)
Braille dots-125
Japanese Braille

=== Braille forms ===
り / リ in Japanese Braille		R + Yōon braille					
り / リ ri	りい / リー rī	りゃ / リャ rya	りゃあ / リャー ryā	りゅ / リュ ryu	りゅう / リュー ryū	りょ / リョ ryo	りょう / リョー ryō
⠓ (braille pattern dots-125)	⠓ (braille pattern dots-125) ⠒ (braille pattern dots-25)	⠈ (braille pattern dots-4) ⠑ (braille pattern dots-15)	⠈ (braille pattern dots-4) ⠑ (braille pattern dots-15) ⠒ (braille pattern dots-25)	⠈ (braille pattern dots-4) ⠙ (braille pattern dots-145)	⠈ (braille pattern dots-4) ⠙ (braille pattern dots-145) ⠒ (braille pattern dots-25)	⠈ (braille pattern dots-4) ⠚ (braille pattern dots-245)	⠈ (braille pattern dots-4) ⠚ (braille pattern dots-245) ⠒ (braille pattern dots-25)

=== Computer encodings ===
Character information
Preview	り		リ		ﾘ		ㇼ		㋷	
Unicode name	HIRAGANA LETTER RI		KATAKANA LETTER RI		HALFWIDTH KATAKANA LETTER RI		KATAKANA LETTER SMALL RI		CIRCLED KATAKANA RI	
Encodings	decimal	hex	dec	hex	dec	hex	dec	hex	dec	hex
Unicode	12426	U+308A	12522	U+30EA	65432	U+FF98	12796	U+31FC	13047	U+32F7
UTF-8	227 130 138	E3 82 8A	227 131 170	E3 83 AA	239 190 152	EF BE 98	227 135 188	E3 87 BC	227 139 183	E3 8B B7
Numeric character reference	&#12426;	&#x308A;	&#12522;	&#x30EA;	&#65432;	&#xFF98;	&#12796;	&#x31FC;	&#13047;	&#x32F7;
Shift JIS (plain)	130 232	82 E8	131 138	83 8A	216	D8				
Shift JIS-2004	130 232	82 E8	131 138	83 8A	216	D8	131 249	83 F9		
EUC-JP (plain)	164 234	A4 EA	165 234	A5 EA	142 216	8E D8				
EUC-JIS-2004	164 234	A4 EA	165 234	A5 EA	142 216	8E D8	166 251	A6 FB		
GB 18030	164 234	A4 EA	165 234	A5 EA	132 49 155 50	84 31 9B 32	129 57 189 54	81 39 BD 36		
EUC-KR / UHC	170 234	AA EA	171 234	AB EA						
Big5 (non-ETEN kana)	198 238	C6 EE	199 164	C7 A4						
Big5 (ETEN / HKSCS)	199 113	C7 71	199 230	C7 E6						

== See also ==
- Japanese phonology
- Yori (kana)
- IJ (digraph), a Dutch digraph that is sometimes written in a manner resembling the katakana リ
