= To (kana) =

to

Hiragana	Katakana
- Transliteration: to
- Translit. with dakuten: do
- Hiragana origin: 止
- Katakana origin: 止
- Man'yōgana: 刀 土 斗 度 戸 利 速 止 等 登 澄 得 騰 十 鳥 常 跡
- Voiced man'yōgana: 土 度 渡 奴 怒 特 藤 騰 等 耐 抒 杼
- Spelling kana: 東京のト (Tōkyō no "to")
- Unicode: U+3068, U+30C8
- Braille: ⠞
- Note: These Man'yōgana originally represented morae with one of two different vowel sounds, which merged in later pronunciation.

To (hiragana: と, katakana: ト) is one of the Japanese kana, each of which represents one mora. Both represent the sound [to], and when written with dakuten represent the sound [do]. In the Ainu language, the katakana ト can be written with a handakuten (which can be entered in a computer as either one character (ト゚) or two combined characters (ト゜) to represent the sound [tu], and is interchangeable with the katakana ツ゚.

Form	Rōmaji	Hiragana	Katakana
Normal t- (た行 ta-gyō)	to	と	ト
Normal t- (た行 ta-gyō)	tou too tō	とう とお, とぉ とー	トウ トオ, トォ トー
Addition dakuten d- (だ行 da-gyō)	do	ど	ド
Addition dakuten d- (だ行 da-gyō)	dou doo dō	どう どお, どぉ どー	ドウ ドオ, ドォ ドー

Other additional forms

Form A (tw-)
Romaji	Hiragana	Katakana
twa	とぁ, とゎ	トァ, トヮ
twi	とぃ	トィ
tu, twu	とぅ	トゥ
twe	とぇ	トェ
two	とぅぉ	トゥォ

Form B (dw-)
Romaji	Hiragana	Katakana
dwa	どぁ, どゎ	ドァ, ドヮ
dwi	どぃ	ドィ
du, dwu	どぅ	ドゥ
dwe	どぇ	ドェ
dwo	どぅぉ	ドゥォ

== Stroke order ==
Stroke order in writing と

Stroke order in writing ト

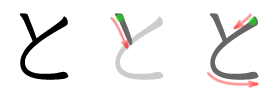
Stroke order in writing と

Stroke order in writing ト

== Other communicative representations ==
Japanese radiotelephony alphabet	Wabun code
東京のト; Tōkyō no "To"	▄ ▄ ▄▄▄ ▄ ▄

Japanese Navy Signal Flag

Japanese semaphore
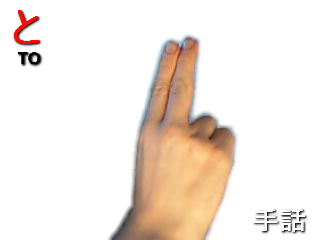
Japanese manual syllabary (fingerspelling)
Braille dots-2345
Japanese Braille

=== Braille forms ===
と / ト in Japanese Braille
と / ト to	ど / ド do	とう / トー tō/tou	どう / ドー dō/dou	Other kana based on Braille と			
と / ト to	ど / ド do	とう / トー tō/tou	どう / ドー dō/dou	ちょ / チョ cho	ぢょ / ヂョ jo/dyo	ちょう / チョー chō	ぢょう / ヂョー jō/dyō
⠞ (braille pattern dots-2345)	⠐ (braille pattern dots-5) ⠞ (braille pattern dots-2345)	⠞ (braille pattern dots-2345) ⠒ (braille pattern dots-25)	⠐ (braille pattern dots-5) ⠞ (braille pattern dots-2345) ⠒ (braille pattern dots-25)	⠈ (braille pattern dots-4) ⠞ (braille pattern dots-2345)	⠘ (braille pattern dots-45) ⠞ (braille pattern dots-2345)	⠈ (braille pattern dots-4) ⠞ (braille pattern dots-2345) ⠒ (braille pattern dots-25)	⠘ (braille pattern dots-45) ⠞ (braille pattern dots-2345) ⠒ (braille pattern dots-25)

=== Computer encodings ===
Character information
Preview	と		ト		ﾄ		㋣	
Unicode name	HIRAGANA LETTER TO		KATAKANA LETTER TO		HALFWIDTH KATAKANA LETTER TO		CIRCLED KATAKANA TO	
Encodings	decimal	hex	dec	hex	dec	hex	dec	hex
Unicode	12392	U+3068	12488	U+30C8	65412	U+FF84	13027	U+32E3
UTF-8	227 129 168	E3 81 A8	227 131 136	E3 83 88	239 190 132	EF BE 84	227 139 163	E3 8B A3
Numeric character reference	&#12392;	&#x3068;	&#12488;	&#x30C8;	&#65412;	&#xFF84;	&#13027;	&#x32E3;
Shift JIS	130 198	82 C6	131 103	83 67	196	C4		
EUC-JP	164 200	A4 C8	165 200	A5 C8	142 196	8E C4		
GB 18030	164 200	A4 C8	165 200	A5 C8	132 49 153 50	84 31 99 32		
EUC-KR / UHC	170 200	AA C8	171 200	AB C8				
Big5 (non-ETEN kana)	198 204	C6 CC	199 96	C7 60				
Big5 (ETEN / HKSCS)	199 79	C7 4F	199 196	C7 C4				

Character information
Preview	ㇳ		ど		ド		ト゚	
Unicode name	KATAKANA LETTER SMALL TO		HIRAGANA LETTER DO		KATAKANA LETTER DO		KATAKANA LETTER AINU TO	
Encodings	decimal	hex	dec	hex	dec	hex	dec	hex
Unicode	12787	U+31F3	12393	U+3069	12489	U+30C9	12488 12442	U+30C8+309A
UTF-8	227 135 179	E3 87 B3	227 129 169	E3 81 A9	227 131 137	E3 83 89	227 131 136 227 130 154	E3 83 88 E3 82 9A
Numeric character reference	&#12787;	&#x31F3;	&#12393;	&#x3069;	&#12489;	&#x30C9;	&#12488;&#12442;	&#x30C8;&#x309A;
Shift JIS (plain)			130 199	82 C7	131 104	83 68		
Shift JIS-2004	131 239	83 EF	130 199	82 C7	131 104	83 68	131 158	83 9E
EUC-JP (plain)			164 201	A4 C9	165 201	A5 C9		
EUC-JIS-2004	166 241	A6 F1	164 201	A4 C9	165 201	A5 C9	165 254	A5 FE
GB 18030	129 57 188 55	81 39 BC 37	164 201	A4 C9	165 201	A5 C9		
EUC-KR / UHC			170 201	AA C9	171 201	AB C9		
Big5 (non-ETEN kana)			198 205	C6 CD	199 97	C7 61		
Big5 (ETEN / HKSCS)			199 80	C7 50	199 197	C7 C5		
