= Ko (kana) =

ko

Hiragana	Katakana
- Transliteration: ko
- Translit. with dakuten: go
- Translit. with handakuten: (ngo)
- Hiragana origin: 己
- Katakana origin: 己
- Man'yōgana: 古 姑 枯 故 侯 孤 児 粉 己 巨 去 居 忌 許 虚 興 木
- Voiced man'yōgana: 吾 呉 胡 娯 後 籠 児 悟 誤 其 期 碁 語 御 馭 凝
- Spelling kana: 子供のコ (Kodomo no "ko")
- Note: These Man'yōgana originally represented morae with one of two different vowel sounds, which merged in later pronunciation.

Ko (hiragana: こ, katakana: コ) is one of the Japanese kana, each of which represents one mora. Both represent IPA: [ko]. The shape of these kana comes from the kanji 己.

This character may be supplemented by a dakuten; it becomes ご in hiragana, ゴ in katakana and go in Hepburn romanization. Also, the pronunciation is affected, transforming into [ɡo] in initial positions and varying between [ŋo] and [ɣo] in the middle of words.

A handakuten (゜) does not occur with ko in normal Japanese text, but it may be used by linguists to indicate a nasal pronunciation [ŋo].

Form	Rōmaji	Hiragana	Katakana
Normal k- (か行 ka-gyō)	ko	こ	コ
Normal k- (か行 ka-gyō)	kou koo kō	こう, こぅ こお, こぉ こー	コウ, コゥ コオ, コォ コー
Addition dakuten g- (が行 ga-gyō)	go	ご	ゴ
Addition dakuten g- (が行 ga-gyō)	gou goo gō	ごう, ごぅ ごお, ごぉ ごー	ゴウ, ゴゥ ゴオ, ゴォ ゴー

== Stroke order ==
Stroke order in writing こ

Stroke order in writing コ

Stroke order in writing こ

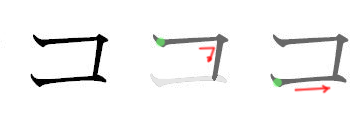
Stroke order in writing コ

== Other communicative representations ==
Japanese radiotelephony alphabet	Wabun code
子供のコ; Kodomo no "Ko"	▄▄▄ ▄▄▄ ▄▄▄ ▄▄▄

Japanese Navy Signal Flag

Japanese semaphore
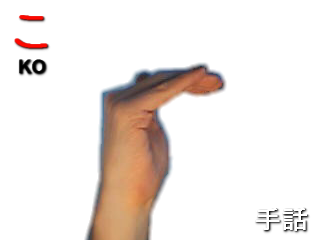
Japanese manual syllabary (fingerspelling)
Braille dots-246
Japanese Braille

=== Braille forms ===
こ / コ in Japanese Braille
こ / コ ko	ご / ゴ go	こう / コー kō/kou	ごう / ゴー gō/gou	Other kana based on Braille こ			
こ / コ ko	ご / ゴ go	こう / コー kō/kou	ごう / ゴー gō/gou	きょ / キョ kyo	ぎょ / ギョ gyo	きょう / キョー kyō/kyou	ぎょう / ギョー gyō/gyou
⠪ (braille pattern dots-246)	⠐ (braille pattern dots-5) ⠪ (braille pattern dots-246)	⠪ (braille pattern dots-246) ⠒ (braille pattern dots-25)	⠐ (braille pattern dots-5) ⠪ (braille pattern dots-246) ⠒ (braille pattern dots-25)	⠈ (braille pattern dots-4) ⠪ (braille pattern dots-246)	⠘ (braille pattern dots-45) ⠪ (braille pattern dots-246)	⠈ (braille pattern dots-4) ⠪ (braille pattern dots-246) ⠒ (braille pattern dots-25)	⠘ (braille pattern dots-45) ⠪ (braille pattern dots-246) ⠒ (braille pattern dots-25)

=== Computer encodings ===
Character information
Preview	こ		コ		ｺ		ご		ゴ	
Unicode name	HIRAGANA LETTER KO		KATAKANA LETTER KO		HALFWIDTH KATAKANA LETTER KO		HIRAGANA LETTER GO		KATAKANA LETTER GO	
Encodings	decimal	hex	dec	hex	dec	hex	dec	hex	dec	hex
Unicode	12371	U+3053	12467	U+30B3	65402	U+FF7A	12372	U+3054	12468	U+30B4
UTF-8	227 129 147	E3 81 93	227 130 179	E3 82 B3	239 189 186	EF BD BA	227 129 148	E3 81 94	227 130 180	E3 82 B4
Numeric character reference	&#12371;	&#x3053;	&#12467;	&#x30B3;	&#65402;	&#xFF7A;	&#12372;	&#x3054;	&#12468;	&#x30B4;
Shift JIS	130 177	82 B1	131 82	83 52	186	BA	130 178	82 B2	131 83	83 53
EUC-JP	164 179	A4 B3	165 179	A5 B3	142 186	8E BA	164 180	A4 B4	165 180	A5 B4
GB 18030	164 179	A4 B3	165 179	A5 B3	132 49 152 50	84 31 98 32	164 180	A4 B4	165 180	A5 B4
EUC-KR / UHC	170 179	AA B3	171 179	AB B3			170 180	AA B4	171 180	AB B4
Big5 (non-ETEN kana)	198 183	C6 B7	199 75	C7 4B			198 184	C6 B8	199 76	C7 4C
Big5 (ETEN / HKSCS)	198 249	C6 F9	199 175	C7 AF			198 250	C6 FA	199 176	C7 B0

Character information
Preview	こ゚		コ゚		㋙	
Unicode name	HIRAGANA LETTER BIDAKUON NGO		KATAKANA LETTER BIDAKUON NGO		CIRCLED KATAKANA KO	
Encodings	decimal	hex	dec	hex	dec	hex
Unicode	12371 12442	U+3053+309A	12467 12442	U+30B3+309A	13017	U+32D9
UTF-8	227 129 147 227 130 154	E3 81 93 E3 82 9A	227 130 179 227 130 154	E3 82 B3 E3 82 9A	227 139 153	E3 8B 99
Numeric character reference	&#12371;&#12442;	&#x3053;&#x309A;	&#12467;&#12442;	&#x30B3;&#x309A;	&#13017;	&#x32D9;
Shift JIS-2004	130 246	82 F6	131 152	83 98		
EUC-JIS-2004	164 251	A4 FB	165 251	A5 FB		

== See also ==
- Koto (kana)
