= Oni (letter) =

16th letter of the three Georgian scripts

- Ⴍ ⴍ ო Ო

Usage
- Writing system: Georgian script
- Type: Alphabetic
- Language of origin: Georgian language
- Sound values: [o̞]
- In Unicode: U+10AD, U+2D0D, U+10DD, U+1C9D
- Alphabetical position: 16

History
Development
D4
      - Ο ο
        - Ⴍ ⴍ ო Ო
- Time period: c. 430 to present
- Transliterations: O

Other
- Associated numbers: 70
- Writing direction: Left-to-right

Oni, or On (Asomtavruli: Ⴍ; Nuskhuri: ⴍ; Mkhedruli; ო or ʟ; Mtavruli: Ო; Georgian: ონი, ონ) is the 16th letter of the three Georgian scripts. The letter Oni can also be spelled like the Latin letter L, however this version of writing Oni has fallen out of favour.

In the system of Georgian numerals, it has a value of 70. Oni commonly represents the mid back rounded vowel /o̞/, like between the pronunciation of ⟨o⟩ in "story" and the pronunciation of ⟨aw⟩ in "yawn" (Received Pronunciation). It is typically romanized with the letter O.

An additional mkhedruli oni letters, ო̈ with an umlaut, ო̄ with a macron and ო̄̈ with both umlaut and macron are used in the Svan language.

== Letter ==
asomtavruli	nuskhuri	mkhedruli		mtavruli
asomtavruli	nuskhuri	standard	alternative	mtavruli

=== Three-dimensional ===
asomtavruli

nuskhuri

mkhedruli

=== Stroke order ===
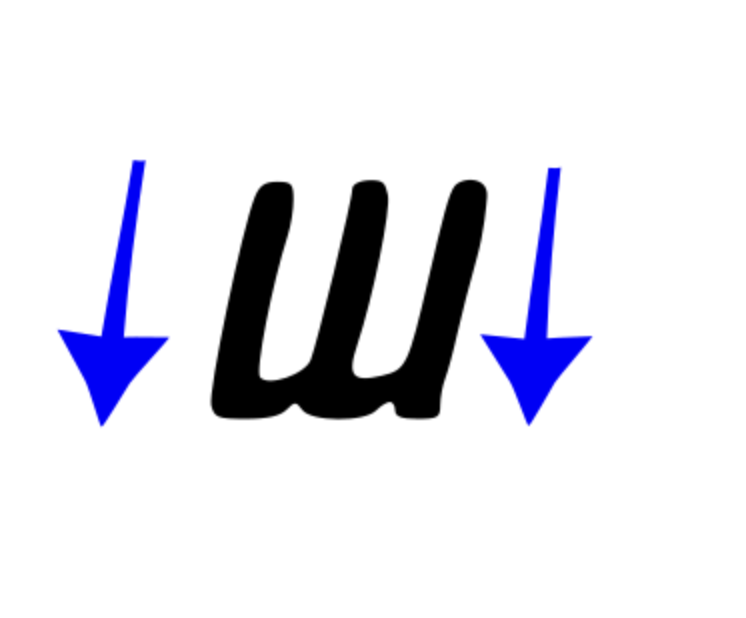
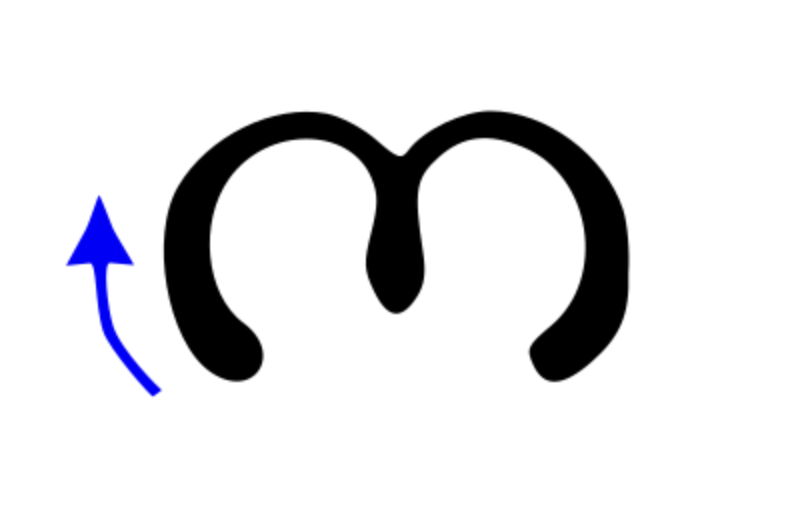
asomtavruli	nuskhuri	mkhedruli
asomtavruli	nuskhuri	standard	alternative

== Computer encodings ==
Character information
Preview	Ⴍ		ⴍ		ო		Ო	
Unicode name	GEORGIAN CAPITAL LETTER ON		GEORGIAN SMALL LETTER ON		GEORGIAN LETTER ON		GEORGIAN MTAVRULI CAPITAL LETTER ON	
Encodings	decimal	hex	dec	hex	dec	hex	dec	hex
Unicode	4269	U+10AD	11533	U+2D0D	4317	U+10DD	7325	U+1C9D
UTF-8	225 130 173	E1 82 AD	226 180 141	E2 B4 8D	225 131 157	E1 83 9D	225 178 157	E1 B2 9D
Numeric character reference	&#4269;	&#x10AD;	&#11533;	&#x2D0D;	&#4317;	&#x10DD;	&#7325;	&#x1C9D;

== With diacritic ==
ო̈	ო̄	ო̄̈
U+10DD U+0308	U+10DD U+0304	U+10DD U+0304 U+0308

== Braille ==
mkhedruli

== See also ==
- Latin letter O
- Cyrillic letter O
- Greek letter Omega (ω)

== Bibliography ==
- Mchedlidze, T. (1) The restored Georgian alphabet, Fulda, Germany, 2013
- Mchedlidze, T. (2) The Georgian script; Dictionary and guide, Fulda, Germany, 2013
- Machavariani, E. Georgian manuscripts, Tbilisi, 2011
- The Unicode Standard, Version 6.3, (1) Georgian, 1991-2013
- The Unicode Standard, Version 6.3, (2) Georgian Supplement, 1991-2013
