= MSX character set =

Character set developed by Microsoft

- Language(s): Arabic, Portuguese, German, English, Japanese, Korean, Russian
- Created by: Microsoft
- Based on: code page 437

MSX character sets are a group of single- and double-byte character sets developed by Microsoft for MSX computers. They are based on code page 437.

== Character sets ==
The following table shows the MSX character set. Each character is shown with a potential Unicode equivalent if available. Control characters and other non-printing characters are represented by their names.

Character set differences exist, depending on the target market of the machine. These are the variations:

- Arabic
- Brazilian
- German DIN
- International
- Japanese
- Korean
- Russian

The German DIN and International character sets are identical, apart from the style of zero (0) character. The international character set has a zero with a slash, while the DIN character set has a dotted zero.

The MSX terminal is compatible with VT52 escape codes, plus extra control codes shown below.

MSX International
	0	1	2	3	4	5	6	7	8	9	A	B	C	D	E	F
0x	NULL	graph	WB (Note: moves the cursor to the previous word)			ceol (Note: deletes the line to the right of the cursor)	WF (Note: moves the cursor to the next word)	BEEP	BS	TAB	LF	home (Note: places the cursor at top left of the screen)	CLS	RET	eol (Note: moves the cursor to the end of the line)	
1x			INS (Note: insert key)			DL (Note: deletes the line where the cursor is located)			select (Note: Special key. Its function can vary amongst applications)			ESC	⇨ (Note: moves the cursor one character to the right)	⇦ (Note: moves the cursor one character to the left)	⇧ (Note: moves the cursor up)	⇩ (Note: moves the cursor down)
2x	SP	!	"	#	$	%	&	'	(	)	*	+	,	-	.	/
3x	0	1	2	3	4	5	6	7	8	9	:	;	<	=	>	?
4x	@	A	B	C	D	E	F	G	H	I	J	K	L	M	N	O
5x	P	Q	R	S	T	U	V	W	X	Y	Z	[	\	]		_
6x	`	a	b	c	d	e	f	g	h	i	j	k	l	m	n	o
7x	p	q	r	s	t	u	v	w	x	y	z	{	|	}	~	DEL
8x	Ç	ü	é	â	ä	à	å	ç	ê	ë	è	ï	î	ì	Ä	Å
9x	É	æ	Æ	ô	ö	ò	û	ù	ÿ	Ö	Ü	¢	£	¥	₧	ƒ
Ax	á	í	ó	ú	ñ	Ñ	ª	º	¿	⌐	¬	½	¼	¡	«	»
Bx	Ã	ã	Ĩ	ĩ	Õ (Note: could also be Ő)	õ (Note: could also be ő)	Ű	ű	Ĳ	ĳ	¾	∽	◊	‰	¶	§
Cx	▂	▚	▆	🮂	▬	🮅	▎	▞	▊	🮇	🮊	🮙	🮘	🭭	🭯	🭬
Dx	🭮	🮚	🮛	▘	▗	▝	▖	🮖	Δ	‡	ω	█	▄	▌	▐	▀
Ex	α	ß	Γ	π	Σ	σ	µ	τ	Φ	Θ	Ω	δ	∞	⌀	∈	∩
Fx	≡	±	≥	≤	⌠	⌡	÷	≈	°	∙	·	√	ⁿ	²	■	cursor

MSX International
	0	1	2	3	4	5	6	7	8	9	A	B	C	D	E	F
4x	NBSP	☺	☻	♥	♦	♣	♠	•	◘	○	◙	♂	♀	♪	♫	☼
5x	⟊	┴	┬	┤	├	┼	│	─	┌	┐	└	┘	╳	╱	╲	🮯

=== Brazilian variants ===
==== Gradiente custom charset ====
The Brazilian manufacturer Gradiente have initially included a modified MSX character set on their v1.0 machines to allow writing correct Portuguese. Differences are shown boxed. The symbol at 0x9E (158) is the currency symbol for the Brazilian cruzado which is not used anymore.

MSX Brazilian
	0	1	2	3	4	5	6	7	8	9	A	B	C	D	E	F
8x	Ç	ü	é	â	Á	à	¨	ç	ê	Í	Ó	Ú	Â	Ê	Ô	À
9x	É	æ	Æ	ô	ö	ò	û	ù	ÿ	Ö	Ü	¢	£	¥	Cz	ƒ

==== BRASCII ====
Later Brazilian MSX models (v1.1 or higher) included a standardized character set named BRASCII, which solved the accentuation incompatibility problems amongst the different makers.

=== Japanese variant ===
Japanese MSX and MSX2 models used a character set extended from the JIS X 0201 standard (which provided basic single-byte Roman and katakana characters), with hiragana, a few common kanji (accessed via the "graph" key), and various geometric symbols assigned to codepoints left undefined in the original standard.

MSX2+ models equipped with the optional Kanji ROM (as well as the MSX TurboR) added full support for double-byte kanji based on JIS X 0208, via the Shift JIS encoding scheme.

MSX Japanese
	0	1	2	3	4	5	6	7	8	9	A	B	C	D	E	F
0x	NULL	graph	WB (Note: moves the cursor to the previous word)			ceol (Note: deletes the line to the right of the cursor)	WF (Note: moves the cursor to the next word)	BEEP	BS	TAB	LF	home (Note: places the cursor at top left of the screen)	CLS	RET	eol (Note: moves the cursor to the end of the line)	
1x			INS (Note: insert key)			DL (Note: deletes the line where the cursor is located)			select (Note: Special key. Its function can vary amongst applications)			ESC	⇨ (Note: moves the cursor one character to the right)	⇦ (Note: moves the cursor one character to the left)	⇧ (Note: moves the cursor up)	⇩ (Note: moves the cursor down)
2x	SP	!	"	#	$	%	&	'	(	)	*	+	,	-	.	/
3x	0	1	2	3	4	5	6	7	8	9	:	;	<	=	>	?
4x	@	A	B	C	D	E	F	G	H	I	J	K	L	M	N	O
5x	P	Q	R	S	T	U	V	W	X	Y	Z	[	¥	]		_
6x	`	a	b	c	d	e	f	g	h	i	j	k	l	m	n	o
7x	p	q	r	s	t	u	v	w	x	y	z	{	|	}	~	DEL
8x	♠	♥	♣	♦	○	●	を	ぁ	ぃ	ぅ	ぇ	ぉ	ゃ	ゅ	ょ	っ
9x		あ	い	う	え	お	か	き	く	け	こ	さ	し	す	せ	そ
Ax		｡	｢	｣	､	･	ｦ	ｧ	ｨ	ｩ	ｪ	ｫ	ｬ	ｭ	ｮ	ｯ
Bx	ｰ	ｱ	ｲ	ｳ	ｴ	ｵ	ｶ	ｷ	ｸ	ｹ	ｺ	ｻ	ｼ	ｽ	ｾ	ｿ
Cx	ﾀ	ﾁ	ﾂ	ﾃ	ﾄ	ﾅ	ﾆ	ﾇ	ﾈ	ﾉ	ﾊ	ﾋ	ﾌ	ﾍ	ﾎ	ﾏ
Dx	ﾐ	ﾑ	ﾒ	ﾓ	ﾔ	ﾕ	ﾖ	ﾗ	ﾘ	ﾙ	ﾚ	ﾛ	ﾜ	ﾝ	ﾞ	ﾟ
Ex	た	ち	つ	て	と	な	に	ぬ	ね	の	は	ひ	ふ	へ	ほ	ま
Fx	み	む	め	も	や	ゆ	よ	ら	り	る	れ	ろ	わ	ん		cursor

Unencoded halfwidth variants of hiragana letters.

MSX Japanese
	0	1	2	3	4	5	6	7	8	9	A	B	C	D	E	F
4x	NBSP	月	火	水	木	金	土	日	年	円	時	分	秒	百	千	万
5x	π	┴	┬	┤	├	┼	│	─	┌	┐	└	┘	╳	大	中	小

Unencoded halfwidth variants of kanji characters.
