= Hiragana (Unicode block) =

- Range: U+3040..U+309F (96 code points)
- Plane: BMP
- Scripts: Hiragana (89 char.); Common (2 char.); Inherited (2 char.)
- Major alphabets: Japanese
- Assigned: 93 code points
- Unused: 3 reserved code points
- Source standards: JIS X 0208

Unicode Version History
- 1.0.0 (1991): 90 (+90)
- 3.2 (2002): 93 (+3)

Unicode documentation
- Code chart ∣ Web page

Hiragana is a Unicode block containing hiragana characters for the Japanese language.

== Block ==
Hiragana^{[1]}^{[2]} Official Unicode Consortium code chart (PDF)
	0	1	2	3	4	5	6	7	8	9	A	B	C	D	E	F
U+304x		ぁ	あ	ぃ	い	ぅ	う	ぇ	え	ぉ	お	か	が	き	ぎ	く
U+305x	ぐ	け	げ	こ	ご	さ	ざ	し	じ	す	ず	せ	ぜ	そ	ぞ	た
U+306x	だ	ち	ぢ	っ	つ	づ	て	で	と	ど	な	に	ぬ	ね	の	は
U+307x	ば	ぱ	ひ	び	ぴ	ふ	ぶ	ぷ	へ	べ	ぺ	ほ	ぼ	ぽ	ま	み
U+308x	む	め	も	ゃ	や	ゅ	ゆ	ょ	よ	ら	り	る	れ	ろ	ゎ	わ
U+309x	ゐ	ゑ	を	ん	ゔ	ゕ	ゖ			゙	゚	゛	゜	ゝ	ゞ	ゟ
Notes 1.As of Unicode version 17.0 2.Grey areas indicate non-assigned code points

== History ==
The following Unicode-related documents record the purpose and process of defining specific characters in the Hiragana block:

Version	Final code points (Note: Proposed code points and characters names may differ from final code points and names)	Count	L2 ID	WG2 ID	Document
1.0.0	U+3041..3094, 3099..309E	90			(to be determined)
3.2	U+3095..3096, 309F	3	L2/99-238		Consolidated document containing 6 Japanese proposals, 1999-07-15
3.2	U+3095..3096, 309F	3		N2092	Addition of forty eight characters, 1999-09-13
3.2	U+3095..3096, 309F	3	L2/99-365		Moore, Lisa (1999-11-23), Comments on JCS Proposals
3.2	U+3095..3096, 309F	3	L2/00-024		Shibano, Kohji (2000-01-31), JCS proposal revised
3.2	U+3095..3096, 309F	3	L2/99-260R		Moore, Lisa (2000-02-07), "JCS Proposals", Minutes of the UTC/L2 meeting in Mission Viejo, October 26-28, 1999
3.2	U+3095..3096, 309F	3	L2/00-098, L2/00-098-page5	N2195	Rationale for non-Kanji characters proposed by JCS committee, 2000-03-15
3.2	U+3095..3096, 309F	3	L2/00-234	N2203 (rtf, txt)	Umamaheswaran, V. S. (2000-07-21), "8.20", Minutes from the SC2/WG2 meeting in Beijing, 2000-03-21 -- 24
3.2	U+3095..3096, 309F	3	L2/00-115R2		Moore, Lisa (2000-08-08), "Motion 83-M3", Minutes Of UTC Meeting #83
3.2	U+3095..3096, 309F	3	L2/00-297	N2257	Sato, T. K. (2000-09-04), JIS X 0213 symbols part-1
3.2	U+3095..3096, 309F	3	L2/00-298	N2258	Sato, T. K. (2000-09-04), JIS X 0213 symbols part-2
3.2	U+3095..3096, 309F	3	L2/00-342	N2278	Sato, T. K.; Everson, Michael; Whistler, Ken; Freytag, Asmus (2000-09-20), Ad hoc Report on Japan feedback N2257 and N2258
3.2	U+3095..3096, 309F	3	L2/01-050	N2253	Umamaheswaran, V. S. (2001-01-21), "7.16 JIS X0213 Symbols", Minutes of the SC2/WG2 meeting in Athens, September 2000
3.2	U+3095..3096, 309F	3	L2/01-114	N2328	Summary of Voting on SC 2 N 3503, ISO/IEC 10646-1: 2000/PDAM 1, 2001-03-09

== See also ==
- Enclosed Ideographic Supplement (Unicode block) has a single hiragana character: U+1F200
- Kana Supplement (Unicode block) has a single katakana and 255 hentaigana characters
- Kana Extended-A (Unicode block) continues with additional 31 hentaigana characters and has one hiragana character: U+1B123
- Kana Extended-B (Unicode block) continues with additional kana for Taiwanese Hokkien
- Small Kana Extension (Unicode block) has four hiragana characters: U+1B132 and U+1B150–U+1B152
