= Gojūon =

Ordering of characters in Japanese language

Gojūon ordering (hiragana)
	a	i	u	e	o
∅	あ	い	う	え	お
K	か	き	く	け	こ
S	さ	し	す	せ	そ
T	た	ち	つ	て	と
N	な	に	ぬ	ね	の
H	は	ひ	ふ	へ	ほ
M	ま	み	む	め	も
Y	や	𛀆	ゆ	𛀁	よ
R	ら	り	る	れ	ろ
W	わ	ゐ	𛄟	ゑ	を
Additional kana
ん					

archaic
obsolete
unused/unknown

In the Japanese language, the gojūon (五十音; Japanese pronunciation: [ɡo(d)ʑɯꜜːoɴ], lit. 'fifty sounds') is a traditional system ordering kana characters by their component phonemes, roughly analogous to alphabetical order. The "fifty" (gojū) in its name refers to the 5×10 grid in which the characters are displayed. Each kana, which may be a hiragana or katakana character, corresponds to one sound in Japanese. As depicted at the right using hiragana characters, the sequence begins with あ (a), い (i), う (u), え (e), お (o), then continues with か (ka), き (ki), く (ku), け (ke), こ (ko), and so on and so forth for a total of ten rows of five columns.

Although nominally containing 50 characters, the grid is not completely filled, and, further, there is an extra character added outside the grid at the end: with 5 gaps and 1 extra character, the current number of distinct kana in a moraic chart in modern Japanese is therefore 46. Some of these gaps have always existed as gaps in sound: there was no yi or wu even in Old Japanese, with the kana for i and u doubling up for those phantom values. Ye persisted long enough for kana to be developed for it, but disappeared in Early Middle Japanese, having merged with e. Much later, with the spelling reforms after World War II, the kana for wi and we were replaced with i and e, the sounds they had merged with. The kana for moraic n (hiragana ん) is not part of the grid, as it was introduced long after the gojūon ordering was devised. (Previously mu (hiragana む) was used for this sound.)

The gojūon contains all the basic kana, but it does not include:

- versions of kana with a dakuten such as が (ga) or だ (da), or kana with handakuten such as ぱ (pa) or ぷ (pu),
- smaller kana (sutegana), such as the sokuon (っ) or in the yōon (ゃ, ゅ, ょ).

The gojūon order is the prevalent system for collating Japanese in Japan. For example, dictionaries are ordered using this method. Other systems used are the iroha ordering, and, for kanji, the radical ordering.

== History ==
The gojūon arrangement is thought to have been influenced by both the Siddhaṃ script used for writing Sanskrit and the Chinese fanqie system.

The monk Kūkai introduced the Siddhaṃ script to Japan in 806 on his return from China. Belonging to the Brahmic family of scripts, the Sanskrit ordering of letters was used for it. Buddhist monks who invented katakana chose to use the word order of Sanskrit and Siddham, since important Buddhist writings were written with those alphabets.

In an unusual set of events, although it uses Sanskrit organization (grid, with order of consonants and vowels), it also uses the Chinese order of writing (in columns, right-to-left).

Brahmi script, showing vowel ordering

The order of consonants and vowels, and the grid layout, originates in Sanskrit shiksha (IAST: śikṣā, Hindu phonetics and phonology), and Brahmi script, as reflected throughout the Brahmic family of scripts. Specifically, the consonants are ordered from the back to the front of the mouth (velar to labial).

The Sanskrit was written left-to-right, with vowels changing in rows, not columns; writing the grid vertically follows Chinese writing convention.

Correspondence of consonants in Brahmic shiksha and Japanese gojūon orderings
Shiksha (IAST)	k-	kh-	g-	gh-	ṅ-	c-	ch-	j-	jh-	ñ-	ṭ-	ṭh-	ḍ-	ḍh-	ṇ-	t-	th-	d-	dh-	n-	p-	ph-	b-	bh-	m-	y-	r-	l-	v-	ś-	ṣ-	s-	h-
Brahmi	𑀓	𑀔	𑀕	𑀖	𑀗	𑀘	𑀙	𑀚	𑀛	𑀜	𑀝	𑀞	𑀟	𑀠	𑀡	𑀢	𑀣	𑀤	𑀥	𑀦	𑀧	𑀨	𑀩	𑀪	𑀫	𑀬	𑀭	𑀮	𑀯	𑀰	𑀱	𑀲	𑀳
Devanagari	क	ख	ग	घ	ङ	च	छ	ज	झ	ञ	ट	ठ	ड	ढ	ण	त	थ	द	ध	न	प	फ	ब	भ	म	य	र	ल	व	श	ष	स	ह
Hiragana	か		が		か゚	さ		ざ								た		だ		な	は		ば	ぱ	ま	や	ら	ら゚	わ				
Rōmaji	k-		g-		ng-	s-		z-								t-		d-		n-	h-		b-	p-	m-	y-	r-	l-	w-				

=== Discrepancies ===
There are three ways in which the grid does not exactly accord with Sanskrit ordering of Modern Japanese; that is because the grid is based on Old Japanese, and some sounds have changed in the interim.

==== s / さ ====
What is now s / さ was previously pronounced either [ts] or [s], hence its location corresponding to Sanskrit /t͡ʃ/; in Sanskrit /s/ appears towards the end of the list.

==== h / は ====
Kana starting with h (e.g. は), b (e.g. ば) and p (e.g. ぱ) are placed where p/b are in Sanskrit (in Sanskrit, h is at the end) and the diacritics do not follow the usual pattern: p/b (as in Sanskrit) is the usual unvoiced/voiced pattern, and [h] has different articulation. This is because /h/ was previously [p], and pronouncing /h/ as [h] is recent.

(More detail at Old Japanese: Consonants; in brief: prior to Old Japanese, modern /h/ was presumably [p], as in Ryukyuan languages. Proto-Japanese is believed to have split into Old Japanese and the Ryukyuan languages in the Yamato period (250–710). In Old Japanese (from 9th century) and on to the 17th century, /h/ was pronounced [ɸ]. The earliest evidence was from 842, by the monk Ennin, writing in the Zaitōki that Sanskrit /p/ is more labial than Japanese. The Portuguese later transcribed the は-row as fa/fi/fu/fe/fo.)

==== n / ん ====
Moraic n (ん) was not present in Old Japanese (it developed following Chinese borrowings), does not fit with other characters due to having no vowel, and thus is attached at the end of the grid, as in Sanskrit treatment of miscellaneous characters.

=== Examples ===
Japanese mobile phone keypad, showing gojūon column labels

The earliest example of a gojūon-style layout dates from a manuscript known as Kujakukyō Ongi (孔雀経音義) dated c. 1004–1028. In contrast, the earliest example of the alternative iroha ordering is from the 1079 text Konkōmyō Saishōōkyō Ongi (金光明最勝王経音義).

Gojūon ordering was first used for a dictionary in the 1484 Onkochishinsho (温故知新書); following this use, gojūon and iroha were both used for a time, but today gojūon is more prevalent.

Today the gojūon system forms the basis of input methods for Japanese mobile phones – each key corresponds to a column in the gojūon, while the number of presses determines the row. For example, the '2' button corresponds to the ka-column (ka, ki, ku, ke, ko), and the button is pressed repeatedly to get the intended kana.

== Table ==
In each entry, the top entry is the hiragana, the second entry is the corresponding katakana, the third entry is the Hepburn romanization of the kana, and the fourth entry is the pronunciation written in the International Phonetic Alphabet (IPA). Please see Japanese phonology for more details on the individual sounds.

	Ø	/k/	/s/	/t/	/n/	/h/	/m/	/y/	/r/	/w/	/N/
/a/	あ ア a [a]	か カ ka [ka]	さ サ sa [sa]	た タ ta [ta]	な ナ na [na]	は ハ ha [ha]	ま マ ma [ma]	や ヤ ya [ja]	ら ラ ra [ɾa]	わ ワ wa [ɰa]	ん ン n [ɴ] etc.
/i/	い イ i [i]	き キ ki [kʲi]	し シ shi [ɕi]	ち チ chi [tɕi]	に ニ ni [ɲi]	ひ ヒ hi [çi]	み ミ mi [mʲi]	^{1}	り リ ri [ɾʲi]	ゐ^{1} ヰ wi [i]	ん ン n [ɴ] etc.
/u/	う ウ u [ɯ]	く ク ku [kɯ]	す ス su [sɨ]	つ ツ tsu [t͡sɨ]	ぬ ヌ nu [nɯ]	ふ フ fu [ɸɯ]	む ム mu [mɯ]	ゆ ユ yu [jɯ]	る ル ru [ɾɯ]	^{1}	ん ン n [ɴ] etc.
/e/	え エ e [e]	け ケ ke [ke]	せ セ se [se]	て テ te [te]	ね ネ ne [ne]	へ ヘ he [he]	め メ me [me]	^{1}	れ レ re [ɾe]	ゑ^{1} ヱ we [e]	ん ン n [ɴ] etc.
/o/	お オ o [o]	こ コ ko [ko]	そ ソ so [so]	と ト to [to]	の ノ no [no]	ほ ホ ho [ho]	も モ mo [mo]	よ ヨ yo [jo]	ろ ロ ro [ɾo]	を ヲ wo [o]	ん ン n [ɴ] etc.

1. ^^{a} ^{b} ^{c} ^{d} ^{e} These kana are no longer in common use, and are normally replaced with the plain vowel kana いうえ (イウエ) in Japanese publications; however, that has not been done here to avoid ambiguity. Wi and we kana were included in the 1900 standard for kana but removed by subsequent orthographic reforms. Kana for writing explicit yi, ye and wu sounds were given by some nineteenth century textbooks but were not included in the 1900 standard. Since e and ye existed as different phonemes in Old Japanese literature (having since merged), some specialised scholarly works use え / 𛀀 (from the man'yōgana character 衣) to transcribe e and 𛀁 / エ (from man'yōgana 江, where エ is the modern katakana e) to transcribe ye. To avoid confusion with the modern use of the character, エ is also sometimes distinguished as 𛄡, to make it explicitly clear that it stands for ye.

The rows are referred to as dan (段), and the columns as gyō (行). They are named for their first entry, thus the rows are (top to bottom) あ段、い段、う段、え段、お段 while the columns are (right to left) あ行、か行、さ行、た行、な行、は行、ま行、や行、ら行、わ行. These are sometimes written in katakana, such as ア行, and conspicuously used when referring to Japanese verb conjugation – for example, the verb yomu (読む, 'read') is of ma-gyō go-dan katsuyō (マ行五段活用, 'ma-column 5-class conjugation') type.

== Kana classes ==
Meiji writers, including grammarians and phonologists, often grouped kana into classes. The word they used was 音 (on, lit. 'sound'), but their descriptions were based largely on Japanese orthography and the organization of the gojūon table:

- 母音 (boon, lit. 'mother sound'): the five kana of the あ行 of the gojūon table, namely あ, い, う, え, お. Since these kana represented vowels, this term came to mean "vowel" in Japanese, and is now pronounced boin instead. Also known as 単音 (tan'on, lit. 'single sound').
- 父音 (fuon, lit. 'father sound'): these are actual sounds, the consonants of Japanese. Since they were impossible to write with kana, some writers tentatively used the kana of the う段, namely く, す, つ, ぬ, ふ, む, ゆ, る to represent them. This term is no longer in use.
- 子音 (shion, lit. 'child sound'): all the kana of the gojūon table except the あ行. The popular phonological analysis was that 父音 were combined with 母音 to create 子音. This term came to mean "consonant", and is now pronounced shiin instead.
- 清音 (seion, lit. 'clear sound'): all the kana of the gojūon table, spelt without the dakuten or handakuten. Collectively, 母音 and 子音. The concept of "clearness" comes from Middle Chinese phonology (see 清濁音), in which it meant "voiceless consonant", although the consonants /n/ (な行), /m/ (ま行), /j/ (や行), /ɾ/ (ら行) and /w/ (わ行) are better described with the term 濁音 below.
- 濁音 (dakuon, lit. 'muddy sound'): all the kana spelt with the dakuten, such as が, じ, づ, べ. The concept of "muddiness" comes from Middle Chinese phonology, in which it meant "voiced consonant". These were considered part of derived 行, and not part of the table.
- 半濁音 (handakuon, lit. 'semi-muddy sound'): the kana of the ぱ行, spelt with the handakuten, namely ぱ, ぴ, ぷ, ぺ, ぽ. The ぱ行 is not part of the table either. Some writers also called them 次清音 (jiseion, lit. 'partly clear sound'), although this meant "aspirated consonant" in Middle Chinese phonology. Phonologically speaking, the consonant /p/ is more accurately described with the term 清音 above.
- 熟音 (jukuon, lit. 'ripe sound'): kana used to spelt consonant-vowel sequences. Collectively, 子音, 濁音 and 半濁音.
- 促音 (sokuon, lit. 'rushed sound'): the small kana っ (historically represented by the full-sized kana つ and く), used to represent the moraic obstruent /Q/. Dictionaries lists 促声 (sokusei, lit. 'rushed voice') as a synonym, suggesting its origin in Middle Chinese phonology, where 促聲 refers to a checked tone, or a syllable ending in an unreleased plosive consonant (see 促聲).
- 撥音 (hatsuon, lit. 'hooked sound'): the kana ん, used to represent the moraic nasal /N/.
- 直音 (chokuon, lit. 'straight sound'): collectively, 母音, 子音, 濁音 and 半濁音.
- 拗音 (yōon, lit. 'twisted sound'): kana digraphs, consisting of a 直音 and a small kana, such as きゃ or くゎ, although in historical kana orthography, small kana were simply 直音 as well.

== Ordering of variant kana ==
In the ordering based on the gojūon, smaller versions of kana are treated in the same way as full-size versions:

- The sokuon, the small kana tsu, is ordered at the same position as the large tsu. When the words are otherwise identical, it goes after them. For example,
  まつ, まったく, まつば, まとう (matsu, mattaku, matsuba, matou)
- Yōon sounds are ordered in the same positions as the full-sized sounds. When the words are otherwise identical, they collate after them. For example,
  きや, きゃ, きやく, きゃく, きゆ (kiya, kya, kiyaku, kyaku, kiyu).

Voiced versions (those with a dakuten) are classified under their unvoiced versions; If the words are otherwise identical, the voiced version is placed after the unvoiced; handakuten are placed after dakuten. For example,

すす, すず, すすき, すすぎ, すずき, すすむ, すずむ (susu, suzu, susuki, susugi, suzuki, susumu, suzumu)

and

は, ば, ぱ (ha, ba, pa)

== Mnemonics ==
To remember the gojūon, various mnemonics have been devised. For example,

Ah, Kana Signs: Take Note How Many You Read Well.

The first letters in such phrases give the ordering of the non-voiced initial sounds.

For vowel ordering, the vowel sounds in the following English phrase may be used as a mnemonic:

Ah, we soon get old.

The vowel sounds in the English words approximate the Japanese vowels: a, i, u, e, o.

== Bibliography ==
- Kubota, Jun (2007). Iwanami Nihon Koten Bungaku Jiten [Iwanami Dictionary of Japanese Classical Literature] (in Japanese). Tokyo: Iwanami Shoten. ISBN 978-4-00-080310-6. OCLC 122941872.
- Hanzawa, Kan'ichi; Abe, Kiyosuke; Ono, Masahiro; et al., eds. (2002). "Gojūonzu". Case Study: Nihongo no Rekishi (in Japanese). Ofū. pp. 6–11. ISBN 978-4-273-03267-8.
- Mabuchi, Kazuo (1993). Gojūonzu no Hanashi (in Japanese). Taishūkan Shoten. ISBN 4-469-22093-0.
- "The Japanese language", Roy Andrew Miller, ISBN 0-226-52718-2, describes the origin of gojūon in Sanskrit.
- Gendai Kokugo Reikai Jiten, ISBN 4-09-501042-8, used to obtain examples of dictionary ordering.
