= Hatsuon =

Hatsuon (撥音, [hatsɯoɴ], lit. "bouncing sound") may refer to:

- The moraic nasal in the Japanese language
- N (kana), the character used to represent the moraic nasal
