= Won sign =

Currency symbol for the Korean won

₩

Won sign
- In Unicode: U+20A9 ₩ WON SIGN

Currency
- Currency: South Korean won North Korean won Old Korean won

Graphical variants
- ￦
- U+FFE6 ￦ FULLWIDTH WON SIGN

The won sign ⟨₩⟩, is a currency symbol. It represents the South Korean won, the North Korean won and, unofficially, the old Korean won.

== Appearance ==
Its appearance is "W" (the first letter of "Won") with a horizontal strike going through the center. Some fonts display the won sign with two horizontal lines, and others with only one horizontal line. Both forms are used when handwritten.

== Encoding ==
The Unicode code point is U+20A9 ₩ WON SIGN: this is valid for either appearance. Additionally, there is a fullwidth character at U+FFE6 ￦ FULLWIDTH WON SIGN (in the block halfwidth and fullwidth forms).

=== Microsoft Windows ===
In Microsoft Windows code page 949, the position 0x5C is used for the won sign (in Code page 850 (latin script), this codepoint is used for backslash).

In Korean versions of Windows, many fonts (including system fonts) display the backslash character as the won sign. This also applies to the directory separator character (for example, C:₩Program Files₩) and the escape character (₩n).

The same issue (of dual use of the 0x5C code point) is seen with the yen sign in Japanese versions of Windows.

=== MacOS ===
In macOS, the won sign key inputs U+20A9 ₩ WON SIGN only when in Hangul input mode.

== See also ==
- Pound sign § Double bar style
