= Hiragana =

Japanese syllabary

Hiragana 平仮名 ひらがな
- Script type: Syllabary
- Period: c. 800 – present
- Direction: Vertical right-to-left, left-to-right
- Languages: Japanese, Hachijō and the Ryukyuan languages

Related scripts
- Parent systems: Oracle bone script: Seal script; Clerical script; Regular script (kanji); Man'yōgana; Hiragana
- Sister systems: Katakana, Hentaigana

ISO 15924
- ISO 15924: Hira (410), Hiragana

Unicode
- Unicode alias: Hiragana
- Unicode range: Hiragana: U+3040–U+309F; Kana Extended-B: U+1AFF0–U+1AFFF; Kana Supplement: U+1B000–U+1B0FF; Kana Extended-A: U+1B100–U+1B12F; Small Kana Extension: U+1B130–U+1B16F

Hiragana (平仮名, ひらがな; IPA: [çì.ɾä́.ɡä́.nä̀, -nä́, -ŋä́-]) is a Japanese syllabary, part of the Japanese writing system, along with katakana as well as kanji (Chinese characters).

It is a phonetic lettering system. The word hiragana means "common" or "plain" kana (originally also "easy", as contrasted with kanji).

Historically, hiragana developed from cursive forms of kanji via man'yōgana, with each sign originating as a simplified cursive rendering of a whole kanji—for example, あ (a) from 安 (an).

Hiragana and katakana are both kana systems. With few exceptions, each mora in the Japanese language is represented by one character (or one digraph) in each system. This may be a vowel such as /a/ (hiragana あ); a consonant followed by a vowel such as /ka/ (か); or the nasal sonorant /N/ (ん). Because the characters of the kana do not represent single consonants (except in the case of the aforementioned ん), the kana are referred to as syllabic symbols and not alphabetic letters.

Hiragana is used to write okurigana (kana suffixes following a kanji root, for example to inflect verbs and adjectives), various grammatical and function words including particles, and miscellaneous other native words for which there are no kanji or whose kanji form is obscure or too formal for the writing purpose. Words that do have common kanji renditions may also sometimes be written instead in hiragana, according to an individual author's preference, for example to impart an informal feel. Hiragana is also used to write furigana, a reading aid that shows the pronunciation of kanji characters.

There are two main systems of ordering hiragana: the old-fashioned iroha ordering and the more prevalent gojūon ordering.

== Writing system ==
Basic hiragana characters
	a	i	u	e	o
∅	あ	い	う	え	お
k	か	き	く	け	こ
s	さ	し	す	せ	そ
t	た	ち	つ	て	と
n	な	に	ぬ	ね	の
h	は	ひ	ふ	へ	ほ
m	ま	み	む	め	も
y	や		ゆ		よ
r	ら	り	る	れ	ろ
w	わ	ゐ		ゑ	を
ん (n)
Main functional marks and diacritics
っ	ゝ	゛		゜	

Only used in some proper names

After the 1900 script reform, which deemed hundreds of characters hentaigana, the hiragana syllabary consists of 48 base characters, of which two ([ゐ and ゑ) are only used in some proper names:

- 5 singular vowels: あ /a/, い /i/, う /u/, え /e/, お /o/ (respectively pronounced [a], [i], [ɯ], [e] and [o])
- 42 consonant–vowel unions: for example き /ki/, て /te/, ほ /ho/, ゆ /yu/, わ /wa/ (respectively pronounced [ki], [te], [ho], [jɯ] and [wa])
- 1 singular consonant (ん), romanized as n.

These are conceived as a 5×10 grid (gojūon, 五十音, "Fifty Sounds"), as illustrated in the adjacent table, read あ (a), い (i), う (u), え (e), お (o), か (ka), き (ki), く (ku), け (ke), こ (ko) and so forth (but si→shi, ti→chi, tu→tsu, hu→fu, wi→i, we→e, wo→o). Of the 50 theoretically possible combinations, yi, ye, and wu are completely unused. On the w row, ゐ and ゑ, pronounced [i] and [e] respectively, are uncommon in modern Japanese, while を, pronounced [o], is common as a particle but otherwise rare. Strictly speaking, the singular consonant ん (n) is considered to be outside the gojūon.

These basic characters can be modified in various ways. By adding a dakuten marker ( ゛), a voiceless consonant is turned into a voiced consonant: k→g, ts/s→z, t→d, h/f→b and ch/sh→j (also u→v(u)). For example, か (ka) becomes が (ga). Hiragana beginning with an h (or f) sound can also add a handakuten marker ( ゜) changing the h (f) to a p. For example, は (ha) becomes ぱ (pa).

A small version of the hiragana for ya, yu, or yo (ゃ, ゅ, or ょ respectively) may be added to hiragana ending in i. This changes the i vowel sound to a glide (palatalization) to a, u or o. For example, き (ki) plus ゃ (small ya) becomes きゃ (kya). The addition of the small y kana is called yōon.

A small tsu っ, called a sokuon, indicates that the following consonant is geminated (doubled). In Japanese this is an important distinction in pronunciation; for example, compare さか, saka, "hill" with さっか, sakka, "author". However, it cannot be used to double an n – for this purpose, the singular n (ん) is added in front of the syllable, as in みんな (minna, "all"). The sokuon also sometimes appears at the end of utterances, where it denotes a glottal stop, as in いてっ! ([iteʔ], "Ouch!").

Two hiragana have pronunciations that depend on the context:

- は is pronounced [wa] when used as a particle (otherwise, [ha]).
- へ is pronounced [e] when used as a particle (otherwise, [he]).

Hiragana usually spells long vowels with the addition of a second vowel kana; for example, おかあさん (o-ka-a-sa-n, "mother"). The chōonpu (long vowel mark) (ー) used in katakana is rarely used with hiragana, for example in the word らーめん, rāmen, but this usage is considered non-standard in Japanese. However, the Okinawan language uses chōonpu with hiragana. In informal writing, small versions of the five vowel kana are sometimes used to represent trailing off sounds (はぁ, haa, ねぇ, nee). Plain (clear) and voiced iteration marks are written in hiragana as ゝ and ゞ, respectively. These marks are rarely used nowadays.

== Table of hiragana ==
The following table shows the complete hiragana together with the modified Hepburn romanization and IPA transcription, arranged in four categories, each of them displayed in the gojūon order. Those whose romanization are in bold do not use the initial consonant for that row. For all syllables besides ん, the pronunciation indicated is for word-initial syllables; for mid-word pronunciations see below.

Hiragana syllabograms
	Monographs (gojūon)					Digraphs (yōon)		
	a	i	u	e	o	ya	yu	yo
∅	あ a [a]	い i [i]	う u [ɯ]	え e [e]	お o [o]			
K	か ka [ka]	き ki [ki]	く ku [kɯ]	け ke [ke]	こ ko [ko]	きゃ kya [kʲa]	きゅ kyu [kʲɯ]	きょ kyo [kʲo]
S	さ sa [sa]	し **shi** [ɕi]	す su [sɯ]	せ se [se]	そ so [so]	しゃ **sha** [ɕa]	しゅ **shu** [ɕɯ]	しょ **sho** [ɕo]
T	た ta [ta]	ち **chi** [tɕi]	つ **tsu** [tsɯ]	て te [te]	と to [to]	ちゃ **cha** [tɕa]	ちゅ **chu** [tɕɯ]	ちょ **cho** [tɕo]
N	な na [na]	に ni [ɲi]	ぬ nu [nɯ]	ね ne [ne]	の no [no]	にゃ **nya** [ɲa]	にゅ **nyu** [ɲɯ]	にょ **nyo** [ɲo]
H	は ha [ha] (wa [wa] as particle)	ひ hi [çi]	ふ **fu** [ɸɯ]	へ he [he] (e [e] as particle)	ほ ho [ho]	ひゃ **hya** [ça]	ひゅ **hyu** [çɯ]	ひょ **hyo** [ço]
M	ま ma [ma]	み mi [mi]	む mu [mɯ]	め me [me]	も mo [mo]	みゃ mya [mʲa]	みゅ myu [mʲɯ]	みょ myo [mʲo]
Y	や ya [ja]	𛀆 **i** [i]	ゆ yu [jɯ]	𛀁 **e** [e]	よ yo [jo]			
R	ら ra [ɾa]	り ri [ɾi]	る ru [ɾɯ]	れ re [ɾe]	ろ ro [ɾo]	りゃ rya [ɾʲa]	りゅ ryu [ɾʲɯ]	りょ ryo [ɾʲo]
W	わ wa [wa]	ゐ **i** [i]	𛄟 **u** [ɯ]	ゑ **e** [e]	を **o** (Note: を is transliterated as o in Modified Hepburn and Kunrei and as wo in Traditional Hepburn and Nippon-shiki.) [o]			
	Monographs (gojūon) with diacritics (dakuten, handakuten)					Digraphs (yōon) with diacritics (dakuten, handakuten)		
	a	i	u	e	o	ya	yu	yo
G	が ga [ɡa]	ぎ gi [ɡi]	ぐ gu [ɡɯ]	げ ge [ɡe]	ご go [ɡo]	ぎゃ gya [ɡʲa]	ぎゅ gyu [ɡʲɯ]	ぎょ gyo [ɡʲo]
Z	ざ za [(d)za]	じ **ji** [(d)ʑi]	ず zu [(d)zɯ]	ぜ ze [(d)ze]	ぞ zo [(d)zo]	じゃ **ja** [(d)ʑa]	じゅ **ju** [(d)ʑɯ]	じょ **jo** [(d)ʑo]
D	だ da [da]	ぢ **ji** [(d)ʑi]	づ **zu** [(d)zɯ]	で de [de]	ど do [do]	ぢゃ **ja** [(d)ʑa]	ぢゅ **ju** [(d)ʑɯ]	ぢょ **jo** [(d)ʑo]
B	ば ba [ba]	び bi [bi]	ぶ bu [bɯ]	べ be [be]	ぼ bo [bo]	びゃ bya [bʲa]	びゅ byu [bʲɯ]	びょ byo [bʲo]
P	ぱ pa [pa]	ぴ pi [pi]	ぷ pu [pɯ]	ぺ pe [pe]	ぽ po [po]	ぴゃ pya [pʲa]	ぴゅ pyu [pʲɯ]	ぴょ pyo [pʲo]

Final nasal monograph (hatsuon)	Polysyllabic monographs (obsolete)					
n	kashiko	koto	sama	nari	mairasesoro	yori
ん n [m n ɲ ŋ ɴ ɰ̃]	kashiko [kaɕiko]	koto [koto]	/ sama [sama]	nari [naɾi]	/ mairasesoro [maiɾasesoːɾoː]	ゟ yori [joɾi]
		゙ goto [goto]				

Functional graphemes
sokuonfu	chōonpu	odoriji (monosyllable)	odoriji (polysyllable)
っ (indicates a geminate consonant)	ー (indicates a long vowel)	ゝ (reduplicates and unvoices syllable)	〱 (reduplicates and unvoices syllable)
		ゞ (reduplicates and voices syllable)	〱゙ (reduplicates and voices syllable)
		ゝ゚ (reduplicates and moves a h- or b-row syllable to the p-row)	〱゚ (reduplicates and moves a h- or b-row syllable to the p-row)

=== Spelling–phonology correspondence ===
In the middle of words, the g sound (normally [ɡ]) may turn into a velar nasal [ŋ] or velar fricative [ɣ]. For example, かぎ (kagi, key) is often pronounced [kaŋi]. However, じゅうご (jūgo, fifteen) is pronounced as if it was jū and go stacked end to end: [d͡ʑɯːɡo].

In many accents, the j and z sounds are pronounced as affricates ([d͡ʑ] and [d͡z], respectively) at the beginning of utterances and fricatives [ʑ, z] in the middle of words. For example, すうじ sūji [sɯːʑi] 'number', ざっし zasshi [d͡zaɕɕi] 'magazine'.

The singular n is pronounced [m] before m, b and p, [n] before plosives (t, d), affricates (ch, ts, j), r, n, and z, [ŋ] before k and g, [ɴ] at the end of utterances, and some kind of high nasal vowel [ɰ̃] before vowels, palatal approximants (y), and some fricative consonants (s, sh, h, f and w).

In kanji readings, the grapheme combinations ou and ei are usually pronounced [oː] (long o) and [eː] (long e) respectively. For example, とうきょう (lit. toukyou) is pronounced [toːkʲoː] 'Tokyo', and せんせい sensei is [seɯ̃seː] 'teacher'. However, とう tou is pronounced [toɯ] 'to inquire', because the o and u are considered distinct, u being the verb ending in the dictionary form. Similarly, している shite iru is pronounced [ɕiteiɾɯ], present progressive form of する (suru, "to do").

In archaic forms of Japanese, there existed the kwa (くゎ [kʷa]) and gwa (ぐゎ [ɡʷa]) digraphs. In modern Japanese, these phonemes have been phased out of usage.

== Spelling rules ==
With a few exceptions, such as for the three particles は (pronounced [wa] instead of [ha]), へ (pronounced [e] instead of [he]) and [o] (written を instead of お), Japanese when written in kana is phonemically orthographic, i.e. there is a one-to-one correspondence between kana characters and sounds, leaving only words' pitch accent unrepresented. This has not always been the case: a previous system of spelling, now referred to as historical kana usage, differed substantially from pronunciation; the three above-mentioned exceptions in modern usage are the legacy of that system.

There are two hiragana pronounced ji (じ and ぢ) and two hiragana pronounced zu (ず and づ), but to distinguish them, particularly when typing Japanese, sometimes ぢ is written as di and づ is written as du. These pairs are not interchangeable. Usually, ji is written as じ and zu is written as ず. There are some exceptions. If the first two syllables of a word consist of one syllable without a dakuten and the same syllable with a dakuten, the same hiragana is used to write the sounds. For example, chijimeru ('to boil down' or 'to shrink') is spelled ちぢめる and tsuzuku ('to continue') is つづく.

For compound words where the dakuten reflects rendaku voicing, the original hiragana is used. For example, chi (血 'blood') is spelled ち in plain hiragana. When 鼻 hana ('nose') and 血 chi ('blood') combine to make hanaji (鼻血 'nose bleed'), the sound of 血 changes from chi to ji. So hanaji is spelled はなぢ. Similarly, tsukau (使う/遣う; 'to use') is spelled つかう in hiragana, so kanazukai (仮名遣い; 'kana use', or 'kana orthography') is spelled かなづかい in hiragana. However, there are cases where ぢ and づ are not used, such as the word for 'lightning', inazuma (稲妻). The first component, 稲, meaning 'rice plant', is written いな (ina). The second component, 妻 (etymologically 夫), meaning 'spouse', is pronounced つま (tsuma) when standalone or often as づま (zuma) when following another syllable, such in 人妻 (hitozuma, 'married woman'). Even though these components of 稲妻 are etymologically linked to 'lightning', it is generally arduous for a contemporary speaker to consciously perceive inazuma as separable into two discrete words. Thus, the default spelling いなずま is used instead of いなづま. Other examples include kizuna (きずな) and sakazuki (さかずき). Although these rules were officially established by a Cabinet Notice in 1986 revising the modern kana usage, they have sometimes faced criticism due to their perceived arbitrariness.

Officially, ぢ and づ do not occur word-initially pursuant to modern spelling rules. There were words such as ぢばん jiban 'ground' in the historical kana usage, but they were unified under じ in the modern kana usage in 1946, so today it is spelled exclusively じばん. However, づら zura 'wig' (from かつら katsura) and づけ zuke (a sushi term for lean tuna soaked in soy sauce) are examples of word-initial づ today.

No standard Japanese words begin with the kana ん (n). This is the basis of the word game shiritori. ん n is normally treated as its own syllable and is separate from the other n-based kana (na, ni etc.).

ん is sometimes directly followed by a vowel (a, i, u, e or o) or a palatal approximant (ya, yu or yo). These are clearly distinct from the na, ni etc. syllables, and there are minimal pairs such as きんえん kin'en 'smoking forbidden', きねん kinen 'commemoration', きんねん kinnen 'recent years'. In Hepburn romanization, they are distinguished with an apostrophe, but not all romanization methods make the distinction. For example, past prime minister Junichiro Koizumi's first name is actually じゅんいちろう Jun'ichirō pronounced [dʑɯɰ̃itɕiɾoː]

There are a few hiragana that are rarely used. Outside of Okinawan orthography, ゐ wi [i] and ゑ we [e] are only used in some proper names. 𛀁 e was an alternate version of え e before spelling reform, and was briefly reused for ye during initial spelling reforms, but is now completely obsolete. ゔ vu is a modern addition used to represent the /v/ sound in foreign languages such as English, but since Japanese from a phonological standpoint does not have a /v/ sound, it is pronounced as /b/ and mostly serves as a more accurate indicator of a word's pronunciation in its original language. However, it is rarely seen because loanwords and transliterated words are usually written in katakana, where the corresponding character would be written as ヴ. The digraphs ぢゃ, ぢゅ, ぢょ for ja/ju/jo are theoretically possible in rendaku, but are nearly never used in modern kana usage; for example, the word 夫婦茶碗, meoto-jawan (couple bowls), spelled めおとぢゃわん, where 茶碗 alone is spelled ちゃわん (chawan).

The みゅ myu kana is extremely rare in originally Japanese words; linguist Haruhiko Kindaichi raises the example of the Japanese family name Omamyūda (小豆生田) and claims it is the only occurrence amongst pure Japanese words. Its katakana counterpart is used in many loanwords, however.

== Obsolete kana ==
=== Hentaigana ===
In the Japanese writing system, hentaigana (変体仮名) are variant forms of hiragana.

=== we and wi ===
On the row beginning with わ /wa/, the hiragana ゐ /wi/ and ゑ /we/ are both quasi-obsolete, only used in some names. They are usually respectively pronounced [i] and [e]. In modified Hepburn romanization, they are generally written as i and e.

In modern orthography, the phonemes 'wi' and 'we' are transcribed in loanwords and names from other languages, as うぃ (ウィ) and うぇ (ウェ).

=== yi, ye and wu ===
==== yi ====
It has not been demonstrated whether the mora /ji/ existed in old Japanese. Though ye did appear in some textbooks during the Meiji period along with another kana for yi in the form of cursive 以. Today it is considered a Hentaigana by scholars and is encoded in Unicode 10 (𛀆) This kana could have a colloquial use, to convert the combo yui (ゆい) into yii (𛀆い), due to other Japanese words having a similar change.

==== ye ====
An early, now obsolete, hiragana-esque form of ye may have existed (𛀁 [je]) in pre-Classical Japanese (prior to the advent of kana), but is generally represented for purposes of reconstruction by the kanji 江, and its hiragana form is not present in any known orthography. In modern orthography, ye can also be written as いぇ (イェ in katakana).

	衣	江
Hiragana	え	𛀁
Katakana	𛀀	エ

While hiragana and katakana letters for "ye" were used for a short period after the advent of kana, the distinction between /ye/ and /e/ disappeared before glyphs could become established.

==== wu ====
It has not been demonstrated whether the mora /wu/ existed in old Japanese. However, hiragana wu also appeared in different Meiji-era textbooks. Although there are several possible source kanji, it is likely to have been derived from a cursive form of the man'yōgana 汙, although a related variant sometimes listed is from a cursive form of 紆. However, it was never commonly used. This character is included in Unicode 14 as HIRAGANA LETTER ARCHAIC WU (𛄟).

== History ==
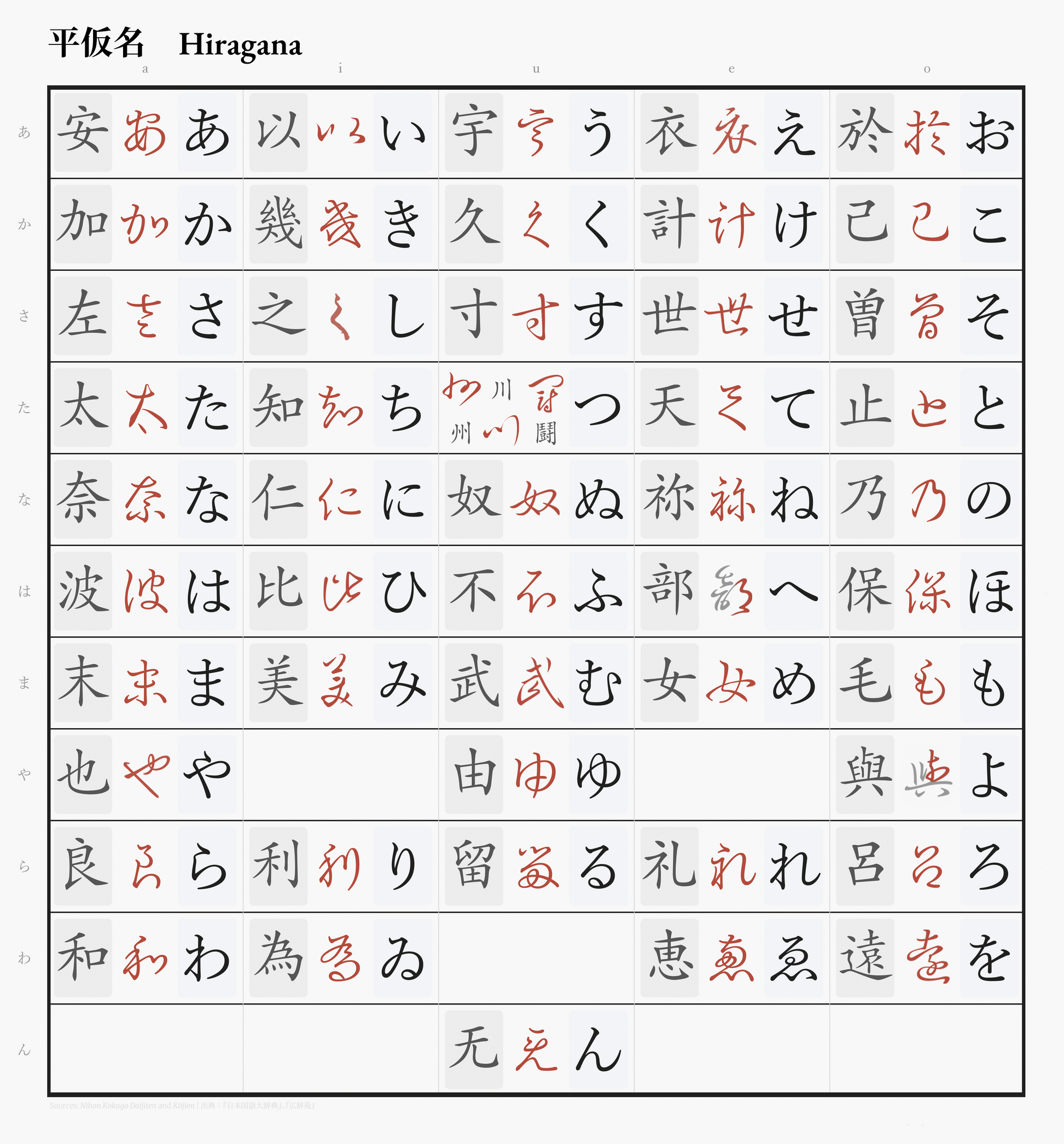
Hiragana originated from the cursive forms of Kanji.

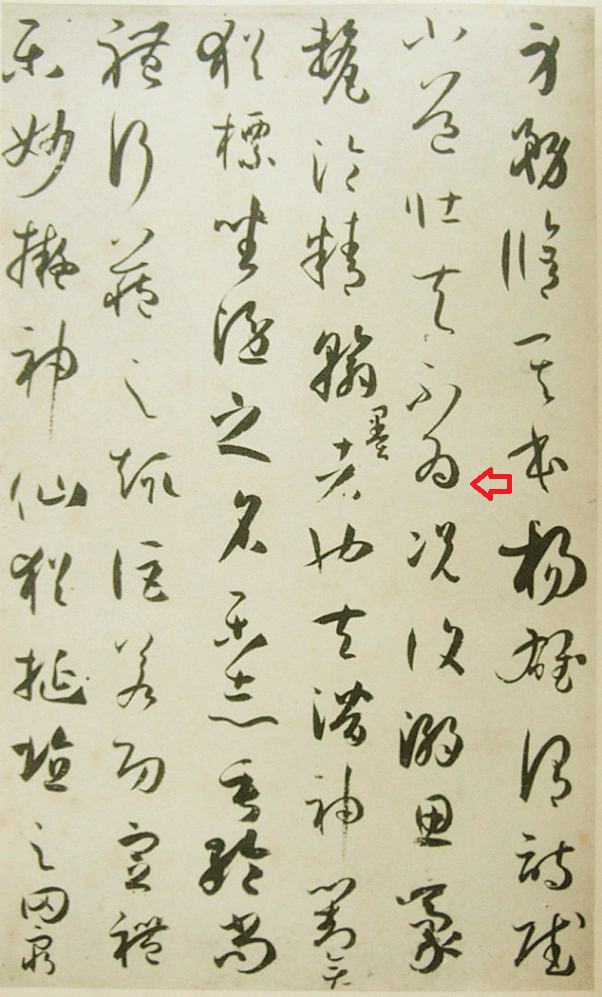
Hiragana character shapes were derived from Chinese cursive script (sōsho). Shown here is a sample of cursive script by 7th century calligrapher Sun Guoting. Note the character 為 (wei), indicated by the red arrow, closely resembles the hiragana character ゐ (wi).

Hiragana developed from man'yōgana, Chinese characters used for their pronunciations, a practice that started in the 5th century. The gojūon arrangement is thought to have been influenced by both the Siddhaṃ script used for writing Sanskrit and the Chinese fanqie system. The monk Kūkai introduced the Siddhaṃ script to Japan in 806 on his return from China. Belonging to the Brahmic family of scripts, the Sanskrit ordering of letters was used for it. Buddhist monks who invented katakana chose to use the word order of Sanskrit and Siddham, since important Buddhist writings were written with those alphabets.

The forms of the hiragana originate from the cursive script style of Chinese calligraphy. The table to the right shows the derivation of hiragana from manyōgana via cursive script. The left part shows the character in the regular script form, the center character in red shows the cursive script form of the character, and the right shows the equivalent hiragana. The cursive script forms are not strictly confined to those in the illustration.

The oldest examples of Man'yōgana include the Inariyama Sword, an iron sword excavated at the Inariyama Kofun. This sword is thought to be made in the year 辛亥年 (most commonly taken to be C.E. 471).

When it was first developed, hiragana was not accepted by everyone. The educated or elites preferred to use only the kanji system. Historically, in Japan, the regular script (kaisho) form of the characters was used by men and called otokode (男手), "men's writing", while the cursive script (sōsho) form of the kanji was used by women. Hence hiragana first gained popularity among women, who were generally not allowed access to the same levels of education as men, thus hiragana was first widely used among court women in the writing of personal communications and literature. From this comes the alternative name of onnade (女手) "women's writing". For example, The Tale of Genji and other early novels by female authors used hiragana extensively or exclusively. Even today, hiragana is felt to have a feminine quality.

Male authors came to write literature using hiragana. Hiragana was used for unofficial writing such as personal letters, while katakana and kanji were used for official documents. In modern times, the usage of hiragana has become mixed with katakana writing. Katakana is now relegated to special uses such as recently borrowed words (i.e., since the 19th century), names in transliteration, the names of animals, in telegrams, and for emphasis.

Originally, for all syllables there was more than one possible hiragana. In 1900, the system was simplified so each syllable had only one hiragana. The deprecated hiragana are now known as hentaigana (変体仮名).

The pangram poem Iroha-uta ("ABC song/poem"), which dates to the 10th century, uses every hiragana once (except n ん, which was a variant of む before the Muromachi era).

== Stroke order and direction ==
The following table shows the method for writing each hiragana character. The table is arranged in a traditional manner, beginning top right and reading columns down. The numbers and arrows indicate the stroke order and direction respectively.

== Unicode ==
Hiragana was added to the Unicode Standard in October, 1991 with the release of version 1.0.

The Unicode block for Hiragana is U+3040–U+309F:

Hiragana^{[1]}^{[2]} Official Unicode Consortium code chart (PDF)
	0	1	2	3	4	5	6	7	8	9	A	B	C	D	E	F
U+304x		ぁ	あ	ぃ	い	ぅ	う	ぇ	え	ぉ	お	か	が	き	ぎ	く
U+305x	ぐ	け	げ	こ	ご	さ	ざ	し	じ	す	ず	せ	ぜ	そ	ぞ	た
U+306x	だ	ち	ぢ	っ	つ	づ	て	で	と	ど	な	に	ぬ	ね	の	は
U+307x	ば	ぱ	ひ	び	ぴ	ふ	ぶ	ぷ	へ	べ	ぺ	ほ	ぼ	ぽ	ま	み
U+308x	む	め	も	ゃ	や	ゅ	ゆ	ょ	よ	ら	り	る	れ	ろ	ゎ	わ
U+309x	ゐ	ゑ	を	ん	ゔ	ゕ	ゖ			゙	゚	゛	゜	ゝ	ゞ	ゟ
Notes 1.As of Unicode version 18.0 2.Grey areas indicate non-assigned code points

The Unicode hiragana block contains precomposed characters for all hiragana in the modern set, including small vowels and yōon kana for compound syllables as well as the rare ゐ wi and ゑ we; the archaic 𛀁 ye is included in plane 1 at U+1B001 (see below). All combinations of hiragana with dakuten and handakuten used in modern Japanese are available as precomposed characters (including the rare ゔ vu), and can also be produced by using a base hiragana followed by the combining dakuten and handakuten characters (U+3099 and U+309A, respectively). This method is used to add the diacritics to kana that are not normally used with them, for example applying the dakuten to a pure vowel or the handakuten to a kana not in the h-group.

Characters U+3095 and U+3096 are small か (ka) and small け (ke), respectively. U+309F is a ligature of より (yori) occasionally used in vertical text. U+309B and U+309C are spacing (non-combining) equivalents to the combining dakuten and handakuten characters, respectively.

Historic and variant forms of Japanese kana characters were first added to the Unicode Standard in October, 2010 with the release of version 6.0, with significantly more added in 2017 as part of Unicode 10.

The Unicode block for Kana Supplement is U+1B000–U+1B0FF, and is immediately followed by the Kana Extended-A block (U+1B100–U+1B12F). These blocks include mainly hentaigana (historic or variant hiragana):

Kana Supplement^{[1]} Official Unicode Consortium code chart (PDF)
	0	1	2	3	4	5	6	7	8	9	A	B	C	D	E	F
U+1B00x	𛀀	𛀁	𛀂	𛀃	𛀄	𛀅	𛀆	𛀇	𛀈	𛀉	𛀊	𛀋	𛀌	𛀍	𛀎	𛀏
U+1B01x	𛀐	𛀑	𛀒	𛀓	𛀔	𛀕	𛀖	𛀗	𛀘	𛀙	𛀚	𛀛	𛀜	𛀝	𛀞	𛀟
U+1B02x	𛀠	𛀡	𛀢	𛀣	𛀤	𛀥	𛀦	𛀧	𛀨	𛀩	𛀪	𛀫	𛀬	𛀭	𛀮	𛀯
U+1B03x	𛀰	𛀱	𛀲	𛀳	𛀴	𛀵	𛀶	𛀷	𛀸	𛀹	𛀺	𛀻	𛀼	𛀽	𛀾	𛀿
U+1B04x	𛁀	𛁁	𛁂	𛁃	𛁄	𛁅	𛁆	𛁇	𛁈	𛁉	𛁊	𛁋	𛁌	𛁍	𛁎	𛁏
U+1B05x	𛁐	𛁑	𛁒	𛁓	𛁔	𛁕	𛁖	𛁗	𛁘	𛁙	𛁚	𛁛	𛁜	𛁝	𛁞	𛁟
U+1B06x	𛁠	𛁡	𛁢	𛁣	𛁤	𛁥	𛁦	𛁧	𛁨	𛁩	𛁪	𛁫	𛁬	𛁭	𛁮	𛁯
U+1B07x	𛁰	𛁱	𛁲	𛁳	𛁴	𛁵	𛁶	𛁷	𛁸	𛁹	𛁺	𛁻	𛁼	𛁽	𛁾	𛁿
U+1B08x	𛂀	𛂁	𛂂	𛂃	𛂄	𛂅	𛂆	𛂇	𛂈	𛂉	𛂊	𛂋	𛂌	𛂍	𛂎	𛂏
U+1B09x	𛂐	𛂑	𛂒	𛂓	𛂔	𛂕	𛂖	𛂗	𛂘	𛂙	𛂚	𛂛	𛂜	𛂝	𛂞	𛂟
U+1B0Ax	𛂠	𛂡	𛂢	𛂣	𛂤	𛂥	𛂦	𛂧	𛂨	𛂩	𛂪	𛂫	𛂬	𛂭	𛂮	𛂯
U+1B0Bx	𛂰	𛂱	𛂲	𛂳	𛂴	𛂵	𛂶	𛂷	𛂸	𛂹	𛂺	𛂻	𛂼	𛂽	𛂾	𛂿
U+1B0Cx	𛃀	𛃁	𛃂	𛃃	𛃄	𛃅	𛃆	𛃇	𛃈	𛃉	𛃊	𛃋	𛃌	𛃍	𛃎	𛃏
U+1B0Dx	𛃐	𛃑	𛃒	𛃓	𛃔	𛃕	𛃖	𛃗	𛃘	𛃙	𛃚	𛃛	𛃜	𛃝	𛃞	𛃟
U+1B0Ex	𛃠	𛃡	𛃢	𛃣	𛃤	𛃥	𛃦	𛃧	𛃨	𛃩	𛃪	𛃫	𛃬	𛃭	𛃮	𛃯
U+1B0Fx	𛃰	𛃱	𛃲	𛃳	𛃴	𛃵	𛃶	𛃷	𛃸	𛃹	𛃺	𛃻	𛃼	𛃽	𛃾	𛃿
Notes 1.As of Unicode version 18.0

Kana Extended-A^{[1]}^{[2]} Official Unicode Consortium code chart (PDF)
	0	1	2	3	4	5	6	7	8	9	A	B	C	D	E	F
U+1B10x	𛄀	𛄁	𛄂	𛄃	𛄄	𛄅	𛄆	𛄇	𛄈	𛄉	𛄊	𛄋	𛄌	𛄍	𛄎	𛄏
U+1B11x	𛄐	𛄑	𛄒	𛄓	𛄔	𛄕	𛄖	𛄗	𛄘	𛄙	𛄚	𛄛	𛄜	𛄝	𛄞	𛄟
U+1B12x	𛄠	𛄡	𛄢	𛄣	𛄤	𛄥	𛄦	𛄧	𛄨							
Notes 1.As of Unicode version 18.0 2.Grey areas indicate non-assigned code points

The Unicode block for Kana Extended-B is U+1AFF0–U+1AFFF:

Kana Extended-B^{[1]}^{[2]} Official Unicode Consortium code chart (PDF)
	0	1	2	3	4	5	6	7	8	9	A	B	C	D	E	F
U+1AFFx	𚿰	𚿱	𚿲	𚿳		𚿵	𚿶	𚿷	𚿸	𚿹	𚿺	𚿻		𚿽	𚿾	
Notes 1.As of Unicode version 18.0 2.Grey areas indicate non-assigned code points

The Unicode block for Small Kana Extension is U+1B130–U+1B16F:

Small Kana Extension^{[1]}^{[2]} Official Unicode Consortium code chart (PDF)
	0	1	2	3	4	5	6	7	8	9	A	B	C	D	E	F
U+1B13x			𛄲													
U+1B14x																
U+1B15x	𛅐	𛅑	𛅒			𛅕										
U+1B16x					𛅤	𛅥	𛅦	𛅧	𛅨							
Notes 1.As of Unicode version 18.0 2.Grey areas indicate non-assigned code points

In the following character sequences a kana from the /k/ row is modified by a handakuten combining mark to indicate that a syllable starts with an initial nasal, known as bidakuon. As of Unicode 18.0, these character combinations are explicitly called out as Named Sequences:

Hiragana named sequences
Sequence name	Codepoints		Glyph
HIRAGANA LETTER BIDAKUON NGA	U+304B	U+309A	か゚
HIRAGANA LETTER BIDAKUON NGI	U+304D	U+309A	き゚
HIRAGANA LETTER BIDAKUON NGU	U+304F	U+309A	く゚
HIRAGANA LETTER BIDAKUON NGE	U+3051	U+309A	け゚
HIRAGANA LETTER BIDAKUON NGO	U+3053	U+309A	こ゚

== See also ==
- Bopomofo (Zhùyīn fúhào, "phonetic symbols"), a phonetic system of 37 characters for writing Chinese developed in the 1900s and which is more common in Taiwan.
- Iteration mark explains the iteration marks used with hiragana.
- Japanese phonology explains Japanese pronunciation in detail.
- Japanese typographic symbols gives other non-kana, non-kanji symbols.
- Japanese writing system
- Katakana
- Nüshu, a syllabary writing system used by women in China's Hunan province
- Shodō, Japanese calligraphy.
