= Zaitōki =

Zaitōki (在唐記, Zaitōki) is an 858 C.E. book by Japanese scholar and monk Ennin. In part of the book he describes Sanskrit sounds.
