= E (kana) =

e

Hiragana	Katakana
- Transliteration: e
- Hiragana origin: 衣
- Katakana origin: 江
- Man'yōgana: 衣 依 愛 榎 曳 延 要 遥 叡 兄 江 吉 枝
- Spelling kana: 英語のエ (Eigo no "e")
- Note: The Man'yōgana represented either the "e" or "ye" mora, which merged in later pronunciation.

E (hiragana: え, katakana: エ) is one of the Japanese kana, each of which represents one mora. In the modern Japanese system of alphabetical order, they occupy the fourth place in the modern Gojūon (五十音) system of collating kana. In the Iroha, they occupy the 34th, between こ and て. In the table at right (ordered by columns, from right to left), え lies in the first column (あ行, "column A") and the fourth row (え段, "row E"). Both represent [e].

Form	Rōmaji	Hiragana	Katakana
Normal a/i/u/e/o (あ行 a-gyō)	e	え	エ
Normal a/i/u/e/o (あ行 a-gyō)	ei ee ē	えい, えぃ ええ, えぇ えー	エイ, エィ エエ, エェ エー

== Derivation ==
え and エ originate, via man'yōgana, from the kanji 衣 and 江, respectively.

The archaic kana ゑ (we), as well as many non-initial occurrences of the character へ (he), have entered the modern Japanese language as え. The directional particle へ is today pronounced "e", though not written as え. Compare this to は (ha) and を (wo), which are pronounced "wa" and "o" when used as grammatical particles.

For the kana romanized sometimes as "e", see we (kana).

== Variant forms ==
Scaled-down versions of the kana (ぇ, ェ) are used to express morae foreign to the Japanese language, such as ヴェ (ve). In several Okinawan writing systems, a small ぇ is also combined with the kana く(ku) and ふ (fu or hu) to form the digraphs くぇ kwe and ふぇ hwe.

== Transliteration ==
In the Hepburn, Kunrei-shiki and Nihon-shiki systems of romanization, both え and エ are transliterated as <e>. In the past Hepburn romanization used <ye> instead. Similarly, the first commonly used Russian system of cyrillization made by Spalvin used <е> ye, unlike the currently prevalent Polivanov system of cyrillization, where the kana are transliterated as <э>.

== Stroke order ==
Stroke order in writing え

Stroke order in writing エ

Stroke order in writing え

The hiragana え is made with two strokes:

1. At the top, a short diagonal stroke proceeding downward and to the right.
2. At the bottom, a stroke composed of a horizontal line, a diagonal proceeding downward and to the left, and a rightward stroke resembling a tilde (~).

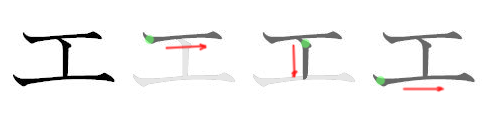
Stroke order in writing エ

The katakana エ is made with three strokes:

1. At the top, a horizontal stroke from left to right.
2. A downward vertical stroke starting in the center of the first stroke.
3. At the bottom, a horizontal stroke parallel to the first stroke, and touching the second. This stroke is usually slightly longer than the first.

This is also the way to make the Latin letter "I" (although the correct upper case form does not look like the lower case Latin letter "l")

== Other communicative representations ==
Japanese radiotelephony alphabet	Wabun code
英語のエ; Eigo no "E"	▄▄▄ ▄ ▄▄▄ ▄▄▄ ▄▄▄

Japanese Navy Signal Flag

Japanese semaphore
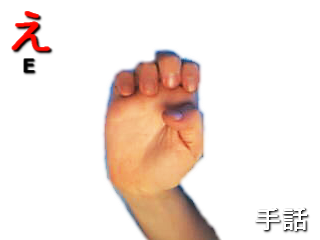
Japanese manual syllabary (fingerspelling)
Braille dots-124
Japanese Braille

=== Braille forms ===
え / エ in Japanese Braille
え / エ e	えい / エー ē/ei
⠋ (braille pattern dots-124)	⠋ (braille pattern dots-124) ⠒ (braille pattern dots-25)

=== Computer encodings ===
Character information
Preview	え		エ		ｴ		㋓	
Unicode name	HIRAGANA LETTER E		KATAKANA LETTER E		HALFWIDTH KATAKANA LETTER E		CIRCLED KATAKANA E	
Encodings	decimal	hex	dec	hex	dec	hex	dec	hex
Unicode	12360	U+3048	12456	U+30A8	65396	U+FF74	13011	U+32D3
UTF-8	227 129 136	E3 81 88	227 130 168	E3 82 A8	239 189 180	EF BD B4	227 139 147	E3 8B 93
Numeric character reference	&#12360;	&#x3048;	&#12456;	&#x30A8;	&#65396;	&#xFF74;	&#13011;	&#x32D3;
Shift JIS	130 166	82 A6	131 71	83 47	180	B4		
EUC-JP	164 168	A4 A8	165 168	A5 A8	142 180	8E B4		
GB 18030	164 168	A4 A8	165 168	A5 A8	132 49 151 54	84 31 97 36	129 57 209 57	81 39 D1 39
EUC-KR / UHC	170 168	AA A8	171 168	AB A8				
Big5 (non-ETEN kana)	198 172	C6 AC	199 64	C7 40				
Big5 (ETEN / HKSCS)	198 238	C6 EE	199 164	C7 A4				

Character information
Preview	ぇ		ェ		ｪ	
Unicode name	HIRAGANA LETTER SMALL E		KATAKANA LETTER SMALL E		HALFWIDTH KATAKANA LETTER SMALL E	
Encodings	decimal	hex	dec	hex	dec	hex
Unicode	12359	U+3047	12455	U+30A7	65386	U+FF6A
UTF-8	227 129 135	E3 81 87	227 130 167	E3 82 A7	239 189 170	EF BD AA
Numeric character reference	&#12359;	&#x3047;	&#12455;	&#x30A7;	&#65386;	&#xFF6A;
Shift JIS	130 165	82 A5	131 70	83 46	170	AA
EUC-JP	164 167	A4 A7	165 167	A5 A7	142 170	8E AA
GB 18030	164 167	A4 A7	165 167	A5 A7	132 49 150 54	84 31 96 36
EUC-KR / UHC	170 167	AA A7	171 167	AB A7		
Big5 (non-ETEN kana)	198 171	C6 AB	198 254	C6 FE		
Big5 (ETEN / HKSCS)	198 237	C6 ED	199 163	C7 A3		

==== Archaic forms ====
Character information
Preview	𛀀		𛀁	
Unicode name	KATAKANA LETTER ARCHAIC E		HIRAGANA LETTER ARCHAIC YE	
Encodings	decimal	hex	dec	hex
Unicode	110592	U+1B000	110593	U+1B001
UTF-8	240 155 128 128	F0 9B 80 80	240 155 128 129	F0 9B 80 81
UTF-16	55340 56320	D82C DC00	55340 56321	D82C DC01
Numeric character reference	&#110592;	&#x1B000;	&#110593;	&#x1B001;
