= Sokuon =

Japanese symbol

The sokuon (促音) is a Japanese symbol in the form of a small hiragana or katakana tsu, as well as the various consonants represented by it. In less formal language, it is called chiisai tsu (小さいつ) or chiisana tsu (小さなつ), meaning "small tsu". It serves multiple purposes in Japanese writing.

== Appearance ==
In both hiragana and katakana, the sokuon appears as a tsu reduced in size:

| | Full-sized | Sokuon |
|---|---|---|
| Hiragana | つ | っ |
| Katakana | ツ | ッ |

== Use in Japanese ==
The main use of the sokuon is to mark a geminate consonant, which is represented in most romanization systems by the doubling of the consonant, except that Hepburn romanization writes a geminate ch as tch. It denotes the gemination of the initial consonant of the symbol that follows it.

Examples:

- Pocky, a Japanese snack food, is written in kana as ポッキー, which is
  ポ (po)
  ッ (sokuon)
  キ (ki)
  ー (chōonpu)
  In rōmaji, this is written pokkī, with the sokuon represented by the doubled k consonant.
- 待って (matte), the te form of the verb 待つ (matsu, "wait"), is composed of:
  待 (ma) (kanji)
  っ (sokuon)
  て (te)
  In the rōmaji rendering, matte, the sokuon is represented by the doubling of the t consonant.
- こっち (kotchi), meaning "here", is composed of:
  こ (ko)
  っ (sokuon)
  ち (chi)
  In Hepburn romanization, kotchi, the sokuon is represented by the t consonant, even though the following consonant is ch. This is because rōmaji ch actually represents [t͡ɕ] (voiceless alveolo-palatal affricate), and the sokuon before it doubles the [t] sound. The Kunrei-shiki and Nihon-shiki romanization systems write this syllable as ti (and its geminate version as tti) so the exception does not arise.

The sokuon never appears at the beginning of a word or before a vowel (a, i, u, e, or o), and rarely appears before a syllable that begins with the consonants n, m, r, w, or y. (In words and loanwords that require geminating these consonants, ン (n), ム (mu), ル (ru), ウ (u), and イ (i) are usually used, respectively, instead of the sokuon.) In addition, it does not appear before voiced consonants (g, z, d, or b), or before h, except in loanwords, or distorted speech, or dialects. However, uncommon exceptions exist for stylistic reasons: For example, the Japanese name of the Pokémon species Cramorant is ウッウ, pronounced /uʔu/.

The sokuon is also used at the end of a sentence, to indicate a glottal stop (IPA [ʔ], a sharp or cut-off articulation), which may indicate angry or surprised speech. This pronunciation is also used for exceptions mentioned before (e.g., a sokuon before a vowel kana). There is no standard way of romanizing the sokuon that is at the end of a sentence. In English writing, this is often rendered as an em dash. Other conventions are to render it as t or as an apostrophe.

In the International Phonetic Alphabet, the sokuon is transcribed with either a colon-like length mark or a doubled consonant:

- kite (来て, "come") – /kite/
- kitte (切手, "postage stamp") – /kitːe/ or /kitte/
- asari (あさり, "clams") – /asari/
- assari (あっさり, "easily") – /asːari/ or /assari/

The sokuon represents a mora, thus for example the word Nippon (日本, Japan) consists of only two syllables, but four morae: ni-p-po-n.

== Etymology ==
Major Japanese dictionaries list sokusei (促声; lit. 'rushed voice'), as a synonym for sokuon (促音; lit. 'rushed sound'). This suggests an origin in Middle Chinese phonology, where sokusei (traditional Chinese: 促聲), also known as nisshō, nissei (入聲; literally "entering voice"), referred to a checked tone, or a syllable that ends in an unreleased plosive (see 促聲). 促聲 contrasts with 舒聲 (literally "leisurely voice") which is a syllable that ends in a vowel, semivowel, or nasal (see 舒聲).

The Meiji-era linguist Ōshima Masatake used the terms sokuon ("plosive") and hatsuon ("nasal") to describe ending consonants in Chinese (which he called Shinago (支那語), an outdated term used from the Edo period until after World War II). These sounds were classified as "labial" (唇內, shinnai), "lingual" (舌內, zetsunai) and "guttural" (喉內, kōnai). Sokuon, in particular, were classified as follows: [p̚] is the "labial plosive" (唇內促音), [t̚] is the "lingual plosive" (舌內促音), and [k̚] is the "guttural plosive" (喉內促音). Another of Ōshima's descriptions even more explicitly related the terms sokuon and hatsuon to the four tones of Middle Chinese.

Modern Japanese sokuon arose, in no small part, from consonant assimilation that occurred when an Early Middle Japanese approximation of a Chinese sokuon, such as pu (labial), t(i) (lingual) or ki/ku (guttural), was followed by an obstruent (plosive or fricative).

== Use in other languages ==
In addition to Japanese, sokuon is used in Okinawan katakana orthographies to represent glottal or ejective consonants. Ainu katakana uses a small ッ both for a final t-sound and to represent a sokuon (there is no ambiguity however, as gemination is allophonic with syllable-final t). As with tsu, sokuon’s katakana form can be used as an emoticon due to its similar appearance to the smile emoticon.

== Computer input ==
There are several methods of entering the sokuon using a computer or word-processor, such as xtu, ltu, ltsu, etc. Some systems, such as Kotoeri for macOS and the Microsoft IME, generate a sokuon if an applicable consonant letter is typed twice; for example tta generates った.

== Other representations ==
Braille:

- Computer encodings

Character information
| Preview | っ | | ッ | | ｯ | |
|---|---|---|---|---|---|---|
| Unicode name | HIRAGANA LETTER SMALL TU | | KATAKANA LETTER SMALL TU | | HALFWIDTH KATAKANA LETTER SMALL TU | |
| Encodings | decimal | hex | dec | hex | dec | hex |
| Unicode | 12387 | U+3063 | 12483 | U+30C3 | 65391 | U+FF6F |
| UTF-8 | 227 129 163 | E3 81 A3 | 227 131 131 | E3 83 83 | 239 189 175 | EF BD AF |
| GB 18030 | 164 195 | A4 C3 | 165 195 | A5 C3 | 132 49 151 49 | 84 31 97 31 |
| Numeric character reference | &#12387; | &#x3063; | &#12483; | &#x30C3; | &#65391; | &#xFF6F; |
| Shift JIS | 130 193 | 82 C1 | 131 98 | 83 62 | 175 | AF |
| EUC-JP | 164 195 | A4 C3 | 165 195 | A5 C3 | 142 175 | 8E AF |
| EUC-KR / UHC | 170 195 | AA C3 | 171 195 | AB C3 | | |
| Big5 (non-ETEN kana) | 198 199 | C6 C7 | 199 91 | C7 5B | | |
| Big5 (ETEN / HKSCS) | 199 74 | C7 4A | 199 191 | C7 BF | | |

== See also ==
- Japanese phonology gives a detailed description of the sound system of Japanese.
- Gemination
- Chōonpu
