= Ki (kana) =

ki

Hiragana	Katakana
- Transliteration: ki
- Translit. with dakuten: gi
- Translit. with handakuten: (ngi)
- Hiragana origin: 幾
- Katakana origin: 幾
- Man'yōgana: 支 伎 岐 企 棄 寸 吉 杵 來 貴 紀 記 奇 寄 忌 幾 木 城
- Voiced man'yōgana: 伎 祇 芸 岐 儀 蟻 疑 宜 義 擬
- Spelling kana: 切手のキ (Kitte no "ki")
- Note: These Man'yōgana originally represented morae with one of two different vowel sounds, which merged in later pronunciation.

Ki (hiragana: き, katakana: キ) is one of the Japanese kana, which each represent one mora. Both represent [ki] and are derived from a simplification of the 幾 kanji. The hiragana character き, like さ, is drawn with the lower line either connected or disconnected.

A dakuten may be added to the character; this transforms it into ぎ in hiragana, ギ in katakana, and gi in Hepburn romanization. The phonetic value also changes, to [ɡi] in initial, and varying between [ŋi] and [ɣi] in the middle of words.

A handakuten (゜) does not occur with ki in normal Japanese text, but it may be used by linguists to indicate a nasal pronunciation [ŋi].

Form	Rōmaji	Hiragana	Katakana
Normal k- (か行 ka-gyō)	ki	き	キ
Normal k- (か行 ka-gyō)	kii, kyi kī	きい, きぃ きー	キイ, キィ キー
Addition yōon ky- (きゃ行 kya-gyō)	kya	きゃ	キャ
Addition yōon ky- (きゃ行 kya-gyō)	kyaa kyā	きゃあ, きゃぁ きゃー	キャア, キャァ キャー
Addition yōon ky- (きゃ行 kya-gyō)	kyu	きゅ	キュ
Addition yōon ky- (きゃ行 kya-gyō)	kyuu kyū	きゅう, きゅぅ きゅー	キュウ, キュゥ キュー
Addition yōon ky- (きゃ行 kya-gyō)	kyo	きょ	キョ
Addition yōon ky- (きゃ行 kya-gyō)	kyou kyoo kyō	きょう, きょぅ きょお, きょぉ きょー	キョウ, キョゥ キョオ, キョォ キョー
Addition dakuten g- (が行 ga-gyō)	gi	ぎ	ギ
Addition dakuten g- (が行 ga-gyō)	gii, gyi gī	ぎい, ぎぃ ぎー	ギイ, ギィ ギー
Addition yōon and dakuten gy- (ぎゃ行 gya-gyō)	gya	ぎゃ	ギャ
Addition yōon and dakuten gy- (ぎゃ行 gya-gyō)	gyaa gyā	ぎゃあ, ぎゃぁ ぎゃー	ギャア, ギャァ ギャー
Addition yōon and dakuten gy- (ぎゃ行 gya-gyō)	gyu	ぎゅ	ギュ
Addition yōon and dakuten gy- (ぎゃ行 gya-gyō)	gyuu gyū	ぎゅう, ぎゅぅ ぎゅー	ギュウ, ギュゥ ギュー
Addition yōon and dakuten gy- (ぎゃ行 gya-gyō)	gyo	ぎょ	ギョ
Addition yōon and dakuten gy- (ぎゃ行 gya-gyō)	gyou gyoo gyō	ぎょう, ぎょぅ ぎょお, ぎょぉ ぎょー	ギョウ, ギョゥ ギョオ, ギョォ ギョー

Other additional forms

Form A (ky-)
Romaji	Hiragana	Katakana
(kya)	(きゃ)	(キャ)
(kyi)	(きぃ)	(キィ)
(kyu)	(きゅ)	(キュ)
kye kyei kyee kyē	きぇ きぇい, きぇぃ きぇえ きぇー	キェ キェイ, キェィ キェエ キェー
(kyo)	(きょ)	(キョ)

Form B (gy-)
Romaji	Hiragana	Katakana
(gya)	(ぎゃ)	(ギャ)
(gyi)	(ぎぃ)	(ギィ)
(gyu)	(ぎゅ)	(ギュ)
gye gyei gyee gyē	ぎぇ ぎぇい, ぎぇぃ ぎぇえ ぎぇー	ギェ ギェイ, ギェィ ギェエ ギェー
(gyo)	(ぎょ)	(ギョ)

== Stroke order ==
Stroke order in writing き

3, 4

Stroke order in writing キ

3

Stroke order in writing き

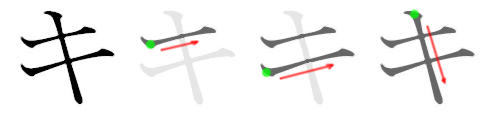
Stroke order in writing キ

== Other communicative representations ==
Japanese radiotelephony alphabet	Wabun code
切手のキ; Kitte no "Ki"	▄▄▄ ▄ ▄▄▄ ▄ ▄

Japanese Navy Signal Flag

Japanese semaphore
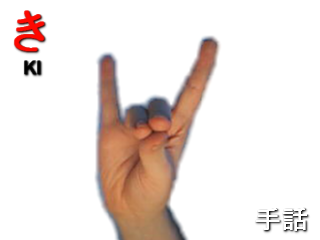
Japanese manual syllabary (fingerspelling)
Braille dots-126
Japanese Braille

=== Braille forms ===
き / キ in Japanese Braille				K + Yōon braille			
き / キ ki	ぎ / ギ gi	きい / キー kī	ぎい / ギー gī	きゃ / キャ kya	ぎゃ / ギャ gya	きゃあ / キャー kyā	ぎゃあ / ギャー gyā
⠣ (braille pattern dots-126)	⠐ (braille pattern dots-5) ⠣ (braille pattern dots-126)	⠣ (braille pattern dots-126) ⠒ (braille pattern dots-25)	⠐ (braille pattern dots-5) ⠣ (braille pattern dots-126) ⠒ (braille pattern dots-25)	⠈ (braille pattern dots-4) ⠡ (braille pattern dots-16)	⠘ (braille pattern dots-45) ⠡ (braille pattern dots-16)	⠈ (braille pattern dots-4) ⠡ (braille pattern dots-16) ⠒ (braille pattern dots-25)	⠘ (braille pattern dots-45) ⠡ (braille pattern dots-16) ⠒ (braille pattern dots-25)
K + Yōon braille
きゅ / キュ kyu	ぎゅ / ギュ gyu	きゅう / キュー kyū	ぎゅう / ギュー gyū	きょ / キョ kyo	ぎょ / ギョ gyo	きょう / キョー kyō	ぎょう / ギョー gyō
⠈ (braille pattern dots-4) ⠩ (braille pattern dots-146)	ku	ku	ku	ko	ko	ko	ko

=== Computer encodings ===
Character information
Preview	き		キ		ｷ		ぎ		ギ	
Unicode name	HIRAGANA LETTER KI		KATAKANA LETTER KI		HALFWIDTH KATAKANA LETTER KI		HIRAGANA LETTER GI		KATAKANA LETTER GI	
Encodings	decimal	hex	dec	hex	dec	hex	dec	hex	dec	hex
Unicode	12365	U+304D	12461	U+30AD	65399	U+FF77	12366	U+304E	12462	U+30AE
UTF-8	227 129 141	E3 81 8D	227 130 173	E3 82 AD	239 189 183	EF BD B7	227 129 142	E3 81 8E	227 130 174	E3 82 AE
Numeric character reference	&#12365;	&#x304D;	&#12461;	&#x30AD;	&#65399;	&#xFF77;	&#12366;	&#x304E;	&#12462;	&#x30AE;
Shift JIS	130 171	82 AB	131 76	83 4C	183	B7	130 172	82 AC	131 77	83 4D
EUC-JP	164 173	A4 AD	165 173	A5 AD	142 183	8E B7	164 174	A4 AE	165 174	A5 AE
GB 18030	164 173	A4 AD	165 173	A5 AD	132 49 151 57	84 31 97 39	164 174	A4 AE	165 174	A5 AE
EUC-KR / UHC	170 173	AA AD	171 173	AB AD			170 174	AA AE	171 174	AB AE
Big5 (non-ETEN kana)	198 177	C6 B1	199 69	C7 45			198 178	C6 B2	199 70	C7 46
Big5 (ETEN / HKSCS)	198 243	C6 F3	199 169	C7 A9			198 244	C6 F4	199 170	C7 AA

Character information
Preview	き゚		キ゚		㋖	
Unicode name	HIRAGANA LETTER BIDAKUON NGI		KATAKANA LETTER BIDAKUON NGI		CIRCLED KATAKANA KI	
Encodings	decimal	hex	dec	hex	dec	hex
Unicode	12365 12442	U+304D+309A	12461 12442	U+30AD+309A	13014	U+32D6
UTF-8	227 129 141 227 130 154	E3 81 8D E3 82 9A	227 130 173 227 130 154	E3 82 AD E3 82 9A	227 139 150	E3 8B 96
Numeric character reference	&#12365;&#12442;	&#x304D;&#x309A;	&#12461;&#12442;	&#x30AD;&#x309A;	&#13014;	&#x32D6;
Shift JIS-2004	130 246	82 F6	131 152	83 98		
EUC-JIS-2004	164 248	A4 F8	165 248	A5 F8		
GB 18030					129 57 210 50	81 39 D2 32
