= Hi (kana) =

hi

Hiragana	Katakana
- Transliteration: hi
- Translit. with dakuten: bi
- Translit. with handakuten: pi
- Hiragana origin: 比
- Katakana origin: 比
- Man'yōgana: 比 必 卑 賓 日 氷 飯 負 嬪 臂 避 匱 非 悲 斐 火 肥 飛 樋 干 乾 彼 被 秘
- Voiced man'yōgana: 婢 鼻 弥 備 肥 飛 乾 眉 媚
- Spelling kana: 飛行機のヒ Hikōki no "hi"
- Unicode: U+3072, U+30D2
- Braille: ⠧
- Note: This mora was historically pronounced as "pi" with one of two different vowel sounds, which later merged.

Hi (hiragana: ひ, katakana: ヒ) is one of the Japanese kana, which each represent one mora. Both can be written in two strokes, sometimes one for hiragana, and both are phonemically /hi/ although for phonological reasons, the actual pronunciation is [çi]. The pronunciation of the voiceless palatal fricative [ç] is similar to that of the English word hue [çuː] for some speakers.

Form	Rōmaji	Hiragana	Katakana	Example words (with kanji)
Normal h- (は行 ha-gyō)	hi	ひ	ヒ	ひ hi 日 sunlight; ひ hi 火 flame; ひかり hikari 光 shine/light; ひと hito 人 human
Normal h- (は行 ha-gyō)	hii, hyi hī	ひい, ひぃ ひー	ヒイ, ヒィ ヒー	ひ hi 日 sunlight; ひ hi 火 flame; ひかり hikari 光 shine/light; ひと hito 人 human
Addition yōon hy- (ひゃ行 hya-gyō)	hya	ひゃ	ヒャ	ひゃく hyaku 百 one hundred; にひゃく nihyaku 二百 two hundred
Addition yōon hy- (ひゃ行 hya-gyō)	hyaa hyā	ひゃあ, ひゃぁ ひゃー	ヒャア, ヒャァ ヒャー	ひゃく hyaku 百 one hundred; にひゃく nihyaku 二百 two hundred
Addition yōon hy- (ひゃ行 hya-gyō)	hyu	ひゅ	ヒュ	ひゅうが Hyūga 日向 Hyūga Province
Addition yōon hy- (ひゃ行 hya-gyō)	hyuu hyū	ひゅう, ひゅぅ ひゅー	ヒュウ, ヒュゥ ヒュー	ひゅうが Hyūga 日向 Hyūga Province
Addition yōon hy- (ひゃ行 hya-gyō)	hyo	ひょ	ヒョ	ひょう hyō 豹 panther; ひょうへん hyōhen 豹変 sudden change; ひょうき hyōki 表記 notation; ひょうじょう hyōjō 表情 expression; ひょっとして "hyottosuru/shite" Perhaps; ひょんな "hyonna" unexpectedly
Addition yōon hy- (ひゃ行 hya-gyō)	hyou hyoo hyō	ひょう, ひょぅ ひょお, ひょぉ ひょー	ヒョウ, ヒョゥ ヒョオ, ヒョォ ヒョー	ひょう hyō 豹 panther; ひょうへん hyōhen 豹変 sudden change; ひょうき hyōki 表記 notation; ひょうじょう hyōjō 表情 expression; ひょっとして "hyottosuru/shite" Perhaps; ひょんな "hyonna" unexpectedly
Addition dakuten b- (ば行 ba-gyō)	bi	び	ビ	びん bin 瓶 bottle; ビール bīru beer; びせい bisei 美声 beautiful voice; かびん kabin 過敏 sensitivity; はなび hanabi 花火 fireworks
Addition dakuten b- (ば行 ba-gyō)	bii, byi bī	びい, びぃ びー	ビイ, ビィ ビー	びん bin 瓶 bottle; ビール bīru beer; びせい bisei 美声 beautiful voice; かびん kabin 過敏 sensitivity; はなび hanabi 花火 fireworks
Addition yōon and dakuten by- (びゃ行 bya-gyō)	bya	びゃ	ビャ	さんびゃく sanbyaku 三百 three hundred; びゃくや byakuya 白夜 midnight sun; びゃっこたい byakkotai 白虎隊 Byakkotai
Addition yōon and dakuten by- (びゃ行 bya-gyō)	byaa byā	びゃあ, びゃぁ びゃー	ビャア, ビャァ ビャー	さんびゃく sanbyaku 三百 three hundred; びゃくや byakuya 白夜 midnight sun; びゃっこたい byakkotai 白虎隊 Byakkotai
Addition yōon and dakuten by- (びゃ行 bya-gyō)	byu	びゅ	ビュ	ごびゅう gobyū 誤謬 mistake; ワイドビュー waidobyū wide-view
Addition yōon and dakuten by- (びゃ行 bya-gyō)	byuu byū	びゅう, びゅぅ びゅー	ビュウ, ビュゥ ビュー	ごびゅう gobyū 誤謬 mistake; ワイドビュー waidobyū wide-view
Addition yōon and dakuten by- (びゃ行 bya-gyō)	byo	びょ	ビョ	びょうき byōki 病気 sickness; びょういん byōin 病院 hospital; いちびょう ichibyō 1秒 one second (of time)
Addition yōon and dakuten by- (びゃ行 bya-gyō)	byou byoo byō	びょう, びょぅ びょお, びょぉ びょー	ビョウ, ビョゥ ビョオ, ビョォ ビョー	びょうき byōki 病気 sickness; びょういん byōin 病院 hospital; いちびょう ichibyō 1秒 one second (of time)
Addition handakuten p- (ぱ行 pa-gyō)	pi	ぴ	ピ	ピン pin pin; ピカソ Pikaso Picasso
Addition handakuten p- (ぱ行 pa-gyō)	pii, pyi pī	ぴい, ぴぃ ぴー	ピイ, ピィ ピー	ピン pin pin; ピカソ Pikaso Picasso
Addition yōon and handakuten py- (ぴゃ行 pya-gyō)	pya	ぴゃ	ピャ	ろっぴゃく roppyaku 六百 six hundred; はっぴゃく happyaku 八百 eight hundred
Addition yōon and handakuten py- (ぴゃ行 pya-gyō)	pyaa pyā	ぴゃあ, ぴゃぁ ぴゃー	ピャア, ピャァ ピャー	ろっぴゃく roppyaku 六百 six hundred; はっぴゃく happyaku 八百 eight hundred
Addition yōon and handakuten py- (ぴゃ行 pya-gyō)	pyu	ぴゅ	ピュ	コンピューター konpyūtā computer
Addition yōon and handakuten py- (ぴゃ行 pya-gyō)	pyuu pyū	ぴゅう, ぴゅぅ ぴゅー	ピュウ, ピュゥ ピュー	コンピューター konpyūtā computer
Addition yōon and handakuten py- (ぴゃ行 pya-gyō)	pyo	ぴょ	ピョ	ろんぴょう ronpyō 論評 comment; かんぴょう kanpyō 干瓢 kanpyō; はっぴょう happyō 発表 publication
Addition yōon and handakuten py- (ぴゃ行 pya-gyō)	pyou pyoo pyō	ぴょう, ぴょぅ ぴょお, ぴょぉ ぴょー	ピョウ, ピョゥ ピョオ, ピョォ ピョー	ろんぴょう ronpyō 論評 comment; かんぴょう kanpyō 干瓢 kanpyō; はっぴょう happyō 発表 publication

Other additional forms

Form A (hy-)
Romaji	Hiragana	Katakana
(hya)	(ひゃ)	(ヒャ)
(hyi)	(ひぃ)	(ヒィ)
(hyu)	(ひゅ)	(ヒュ)
hye hyei hyee hyē	ひぇ ひぇい, ひぇぃ ひぇえ ひぇー	ヒェ ヒェイ, ヒェィ ヒェエ, ヒェェ ヒェー
(hyo)	(ひょ)	(ヒョ)

Form B (by-)
Romaji	Hiragana	Katakana
(bya)	(びゃ)	(ビャ)
(byi)	(びぃ)	(ビィ)
(byu)	(びゅ)	(ビュ)
bye byei byee byē	びぇ びぇい, びぇぃ びぇえ びぇー	ビェ ビェイ, ビェィ ビェエ, ビェェ ビェー
(byo)	(びょ)	(ビョ)

Form C (py-)
Romaji	Hiragana	Katagana
(pya)	(ぴゃ)	(ピャ)
(pyi)	(ぴぃ)	(ピィ)
(pyu)	(ぴゅ)	(ピュ)
pye pyei pyee pyē	ぴぇ ぴぇい, ぴぇぃ ぴぇえ ぴぇー	ピェ ピェイ, ピェィ ピェエ, ピェェ ピェー
(pyo)	(ぴょ)	(ピョ)

== Stroke order ==
Stroke order in writing ひ

Stroke order in writing ヒ

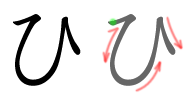
Stroke order in writing ひ

Stroke order in writing ヒ (the first stroke may also be written from left to right )

== Other communicative representations ==
Japanese radiotelephony alphabet	Wabun code
飛行機のヒ; Hikōki no "Hi"	▄▄▄ ▄▄▄ ▄ ▄ ▄▄▄

Japanese Navy Signal Flag

Japanese semaphore
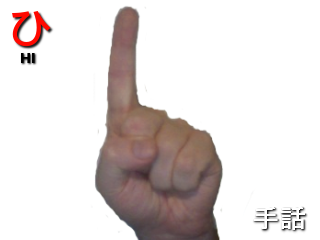
Japanese manual syllabary (fingerspelling)
Braille dots-1236
Japanese Braille

=== Braille forms ===
ひ / ヒ in Japanese Braille						H/B/P + Yōon braille					
ひ / ヒ hi	び / ビ bi	ぴ / ピ pi	ひい / ヒー hī	びい / ビー bī	ぴい / ピー pī	ひゃ / ヒャ hya	びゃ / ビャ bya	ぴゃ / ピャ pya	ひゃあ / ヒャー hyā	びゃあ / ビャー byā	ぴゃあ / ピャー pyā
⠧ (braille pattern dots-1236)	⠐ (braille pattern dots-5) ⠧ (braille pattern dots-1236)	⠠ (braille pattern dots-6) ⠧ (braille pattern dots-1236)	⠧ (braille pattern dots-1236) ⠒ (braille pattern dots-25)	⠐ (braille pattern dots-5) ⠧ (braille pattern dots-1236) ⠒ (braille pattern dots-25)	⠠ (braille pattern dots-6) ⠧ (braille pattern dots-1236) ⠒ (braille pattern dots-25)	⠈ (braille pattern dots-4) ⠥ (braille pattern dots-136)	⠘ (braille pattern dots-45) ⠥ (braille pattern dots-136)	⠨ (braille pattern dots-46) ⠥ (braille pattern dots-136)	⠈ (braille pattern dots-4) ⠥ (braille pattern dots-136) ⠒ (braille pattern dots-25)	⠘ (braille pattern dots-45) ⠥ (braille pattern dots-136) ⠒ (braille pattern dots-25)	⠨ (braille pattern dots-46) ⠥ (braille pattern dots-136) ⠒ (braille pattern dots-25)
H/B/P + Yōon braille
ひゅ / ヒュ hyu	びゅ / ビュ byu	ぴゅ / ピュ pyu	ひゅう / ヒュー hyū	びゅう / ビュー byū	ぴゅう / ピュー pyū	ひょ / ヒョ hyo	びょ / ビョ byo	ぴょ / ピョ pyo	ひょう / ヒョー hyō	びょう / ビョー byō	ぴょう / ピョー pyō
⠈ (braille pattern dots-4) ⠭ (braille pattern dots-1346)	⠘ (braille pattern dots-45) ⠭ (braille pattern dots-1346)	⠨ (braille pattern dots-46) ⠭ (braille pattern dots-1346)	⠈ (braille pattern dots-4) ⠭ (braille pattern dots-1346) ⠒ (braille pattern dots-25)	⠘ (braille pattern dots-45) ⠭ (braille pattern dots-1346) ⠒ (braille pattern dots-25)	⠨ (braille pattern dots-46) ⠭ (braille pattern dots-1346) ⠒ (braille pattern dots-25)	⠈ (braille pattern dots-4) ⠮ (braille pattern dots-2346)	⠘ (braille pattern dots-45) ⠮ (braille pattern dots-2346)	⠨ (braille pattern dots-46) ⠮ (braille pattern dots-2346)	⠈ (braille pattern dots-4) ⠮ (braille pattern dots-2346) ⠒ (braille pattern dots-25)	⠘ (braille pattern dots-45) ⠮ (braille pattern dots-2346) ⠒ (braille pattern dots-25)	⠨ (braille pattern dots-46) ⠮ (braille pattern dots-2346) ⠒ (braille pattern dots-25)

=== Computer encodings ===
Character information
Preview	ひ		ヒ		ﾋ		ㇶ		㋪	
Unicode name	HIRAGANA LETTER HI		KATAKANA LETTER HI		HALFWIDTH KATAKANA LETTER HI		KATAKANA LETTER SMALL HI		CIRCLED KATAKANA HI	
Encodings	decimal	hex	dec	hex	dec	hex	dec	hex	dec	hex
Unicode	12402	U+3072	12498	U+30D2	65419	U+FF8B	12790	U+31F6	13034	U+32EA
UTF-8	227 129 178	E3 81 B2	227 131 146	E3 83 92	239 190 139	EF BE 8B	227 135 182	E3 87 B6	227 139 170	E3 8B AA
Numeric character reference	&#12402;	&#x3072;	&#12498;	&#x30D2;	&#65419;	&#xFF8B;	&#12790;	&#x31F6;	&#13034;	&#x32EA;
Shift JIS (plain)	130 208	82 D0	131 113	83 71	203	CB				
Shift JIS-2004	130 208	82 D0	131 113	83 71	203	CB	131 242	83 F2		
EUC-JP (plain)	164 210	A4 D2	165 210	A5 D2	142 203	8E CB				
EUC-JIS-2004	164 210	A4 D2	165 210	A5 D2	142 203	8E CB	166 244	A6 F4		
GB 18030	164 210	A4 D2	165 210	A5 D2	132 49 153 57	84 31 99 39	129 57 189 48	81 39 BD 30		
EUC-KR / UHC	170 210	AA D2	171 210	AB D2						
Big5 (non-ETEN kana)	198 214	C6 D6	199 106	C7 6A						
Big5 (ETEN / HKSCS)	199 89	C7 59	199 206	C7 CE						

Character information
Preview	び		ビ		ぴ		ピ	
Unicode name	HIRAGANA LETTER BI		KATAKANA LETTER BI		HIRAGANA LETTER PI		KATAKANA LETTER PI	
Encodings	decimal	hex	dec	hex	dec	hex	dec	hex
Unicode	12403	U+3073	12499	U+30D3	12404	U+3074	12500	U+30D4
UTF-8	227 129 179	E3 81 B3	227 131 147	E3 83 93	227 129 180	E3 81 B4	227 131 148	E3 83 94
Numeric character reference	&#12403;	&#x3073;	&#12499;	&#x30D3;	&#12404;	&#x3074;	&#12500;	&#x30D4;
Shift JIS	130 209	82 D1	131 114	83 72	130 210	82 D2	131 115	83 73
EUC-JP	164 211	A4 D3	165 211	A5 D3	164 212	A4 D4	165 212	A5 D4
GB 18030	164 211	A4 D3	165 211	A5 D3	164 212	A4 D4	165 212	A5 D4
EUC-KR / UHC	170 211	AA D3	171 211	AB D3	170 212	AA D4	171 212	AB D4
Big5 (non-ETEN kana)	198 215	C6 D7	199 107	C7 6B	198 216	C6 D8	199 108	C7 6C
Big5 (ETEN / HKSCS)	199 90	C7 5A	199 207	C7 CF	199 91	C7 5B	199 208	C7 D0

== Use in the Ainu language ==
In the Sakhalin dialect of the Ainu language, ヒ can be written as small ㇶ to represent a final h sound after an i sound (イㇶ ih). Along with other extended katakana, this was developed to represent sounds in Ainu that are not present in standard Japanese.
