= Ni (kana) =

ni

| Hiragana | Katakana |
- Transliteration: ni
- Hiragana origin: 仁
- Katakana origin: 仁
- Man'yōgana: 二 人 日 仁 爾 迩 尼 耳 柔 丹 荷 似 煮 煎
- Spelling kana: 日本のニ (Nippon no ni)
- Unicode: U+306B, U+30CB
- Braille: ⠇

Ni (hiragana: に, katakana: ニ) is one of the Japanese kana, which each represent one mora. The hiragana is written in three strokes, while the katakana in two. Both represent /ni/ although for phonological reasons, the actual pronunciation is [ɲi].

Notably, the katakana (ニ) is functionally identical to the kanji for two (二), pronounced the same way, and written similarly.

に is used as a particle, with a similar function to the English "to", "in", "at", or "by":

トン は、 フランス に 行きました。
"Ton wa, Furansu ni ikimashita."
"Ton went to France."

パン は、 トン に 上げました。
"Pan wa, Ton ni agemashita."
"Bread was given 'to' Ton"

六時 に しました。
"Rokuji ni shimashita."
"(I) did it at 6 o'clock."

| Form | Rōmaji | Hiragana | Katakana |
|---|---|---|---|
| Normal n- (な行 na-gyō) | ni | に | ニ |
| Normal n- (な行 na-gyō) | nii, nyi nī | にい, にぃ にー | ニイ, ニィ ニー |
| Addition yōon ny- (にゃ行 nya-gyō) | nya | にゃ | ニャ |
| Addition yōon ny- (にゃ行 nya-gyō) | nyaa nyā | にゃあ, にゃぁ にゃー | ニャア, ニャァ ニャー |
| Addition yōon ny- (にゃ行 nya-gyō) | nyu | にゅ | ニュ |
| Addition yōon ny- (にゃ行 nya-gyō) | nyuu nyū | にゅう, にゅぅ にゅー | ニュウ, ニュゥ ニュー |
| Addition yōon ny- (にゃ行 nya-gyō) | nyo | にょ | ニョ |
| Addition yōon ny- (にゃ行 nya-gyō) | nyou nyoo nyō | にょう, にょぅ にょお, にょぉ にょー | ニョウ, ニョゥ ニョオ, ニョォ ニョー |

Other additional forms

Form (ny-)
| Rōmaji | Hiragana | Katakana |
|---|---|---|
| (nya) | (にゃ) | (ニャ) |
| (nyi) | (にぃ) | (ニィ) |
| (nyu) | (にゅ) | (ニュ) |
| nye nyei nyee nyē | にぇ にぇい, にぇぃ にぇえ にぇー | ニェ ニェイ, ニェィ ニェエ ニェー |
| (nyo) | (にょ) | (ニョ) |

== Stroke order ==
Stroke order in writing に

Stroke order in writing ニ

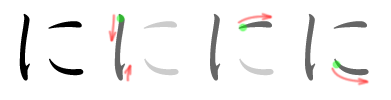

The hiragana に is made with three strokes:

1. A vertical stroke from top to bottom.
2. A short, horizontal stroke to the upper right of the first stroke, going from left to right.
3. Another short, horizontal stroke at the bottom right of the first stroke, going from left to right.

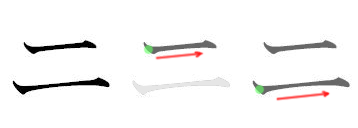

The katakana ニ is made with two strokes:

1. At the top, a horizontal stroke from left to right.
2. Another, longer horizontal stroke under the first stroke

== Other communicative representations ==
| Japanese radiotelephony alphabet | Wabun code |
| 日本のニ; Nippon no "Ni" | ▄▄▄ ▄ ▄▄▄ ▄ |

Japanese Navy Signal Flag

Japanese semaphore
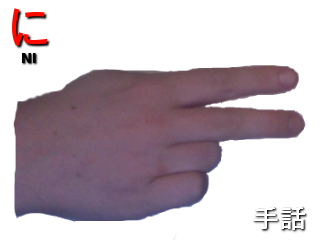
Japanese manual syllabary (fingerspelling)
Braille dots-123
Japanese Braille

=== Braille forms ===
| に / ニ in Japanese Braille | | N + Yōon braille | | | | | |
|---|---|---|---|---|---|---|---|
| に / ニ ni | にい / ニー nī | にゃ / ニャ nya | にゃあ / ニャー nyā | にゅ / ニュ nyu | にゅう / ニュー nyū | にょ / ニョ nyo | にょう / ニョー nyō |
| ⠇ (braille pattern dots-123) | ⠇ (braille pattern dots-123) ⠒ (braille pattern dots-25) | ⠈ (braille pattern dots-4) ⠅ (braille pattern dots-13) | ⠈ (braille pattern dots-4) ⠅ (braille pattern dots-13) ⠒ (braille pattern dots-25) | ⠈ (braille pattern dots-4) ⠍ (braille pattern dots-134) | ⠈ (braille pattern dots-4) ⠍ (braille pattern dots-134) ⠒ (braille pattern dots-25) | ⠈ (braille pattern dots-4) ⠎ (braille pattern dots-234) | ⠈ (braille pattern dots-4) ⠎ (braille pattern dots-234) ⠒ (braille pattern dots-25) |

=== Computer encodings ===
Character information
| Preview | に | | ニ | | ﾆ | | ㋥ | |
|---|---|---|---|---|---|---|---|---|
| Unicode name | HIRAGANA LETTER NI | | KATAKANA LETTER NI | | HALFWIDTH KATAKANA LETTER NI | | CIRCLED KATAKANA NI | |
| Encodings | decimal | hex | dec | hex | dec | hex | dec | hex |
| Unicode | 12395 | U+306B | 12491 | U+30CB | 65414 | U+FF86 | 13029 | U+32E5 |
| UTF-8 | 227 129 171 | E3 81 AB | 227 131 139 | E3 83 8B | 239 190 134 | EF BE 86 | 227 139 165 | E3 8B A5 |
| Numeric character reference | &#12395; | &#x306B; | &#12491; | &#x30CB; | &#65414; | &#xFF86; | &#13029; | &#x32E5; |
| Shift JIS | 130 201 | 82 C9 | 131 106 | 83 6A | 198 | C6 | | |
| EUC-JP | 164 203 | A4 CB | 165 203 | A5 CB | 142 198 | 8E C6 | | |
| GB 18030 | 164 203 | A4 CB | 165 203 | A5 CB | 132 49 153 52 | 84 31 99 34 | | |
| EUC-KR / UHC | 170 203 | AA CB | 171 203 | AB CB | | | | |
| Big5 (non-ETEN kana) | 198 207 | C6 CF | 199 99 | C7 63 | | | | |
| Big5 (ETEN / HKSCS) | 199 82 | C7 52 | 199 199 | C7 C7 | | | | |

== See also ==
- Japanese grammar
