= N (kana) =

n

Hiragana	Katakana
- Transliteration: n, (m), (ng)
- Hiragana origin: 无
- Katakana origin: 尓
- Man'yōgana: 无 尓
- Spelling kana: おしまいのン Oshimai no "n"
- Unicode: U+3093, U+30F3
- Braille: ⠴

N (hiragana: ん, katakana: ン) is one of the Japanese kana, which each represent one mora. ん is the only kana that does not end in a vowel sound (although in certain cases the vowel ending of kana, such as す, is unpronounced). The kana for mu, む/ム, was originally used for the n sound as well, while ん was originally a hentaigana used for both n and mu. In the 1900 Japanese script reforms, hentaigana were officially declared obsolete and ん was officially declared a kana to represent the n sound.

In addition to being the only kana not ending with a vowel sound, it is also the only kana that does not begin any words in standard Japanese (other than foreign loan words such as "Ngorongoro", which is transcribed as ンゴロンゴロ) (see Shiritori). Some regional dialects of Japanese feature words beginning with ん, as do the Ryukyuan languages (which are usually written in the Japanese writing system), in which words starting with ン are common, such as the Okinawan word for miso, nnsu (transcribed as ンース).

The kana is followed by an apostrophe in some systems of transliteration whenever it precedes a vowel or a y- kana, so as to prevent confusion with other kana. However, like every other kana besides yōon, it represents an entire mora, so its pronunciation is, in practice, as close to "nn" as "n". The pronunciation can also change depending on what sounds surround it. These are a few of the ways it can change:

- [n] (before n, t, d, r, ts, and z)
- [m] (before m, p and b)
- [ŋ] (before k and g)
- [ɲ] (before ni, ch and j)
- [ɴ] (at the end of utterances) (Note: The syllable-final nasal in Japanese was traditionally said to be realized as a uvular nasal when utterance-final, but empirical studies have disputed this claim.)
- [ɯ͍̃] (before vowels, palatal approximants (y), consonants h, f, s, sh and w)
- [ĩ] (after the vowel i if another vowel, palatal approximant or consonant f, s, sh, h or w follows.)

Form	Rōmaji	Hiragana	Katakana
Normal n (ん)	n	ん	ン
Normal n (ん)	nn n̄	んん んー	ンン ンー

Other additional forms: Form (nw-)
Rōmaji	Hiragana	Katakana
nwa	んわ	ンワ
nwi	んうぃ	ンウィ
nwu	んうぅ	ンウゥ
nwe	んうぇ	ンウェ
nwo	んうぉ	ンウォ

== Stroke order ==
Stroke order in writing ん

Stroke order in writing ン

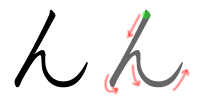
Stroke order in writing ん

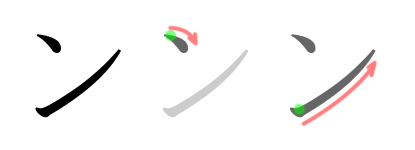
Stroke order in writing ン

== Other communicative representations ==
Japanese radiotelephony alphabet	Wabun code
おしまいのン; Oshimai no "N"	▄ ▄▄▄ ▄ ▄▄▄ ▄

Japanese Navy Signal Flag

Japanese semaphore

Japanese manual syllabary (fingerspelling)
Braille dots-356
Japanese Braille

=== Braille forms ===
ん / ン in Japanese Braille:

=== Computer encodings ===
Character information
Preview	ん		ン		ﾝ		𛅣		𛅧	
Unicode name	HIRAGANA LETTER N		KATAKANA LETTER N		HALFWIDTH KATAKANA LETTER N		HIRAGANA LETTER SMALL N		KATAKANA LETTER SMALL N	
Encodings	decimal	hex	dec	hex	dec	hex	dec	hex	dec	hex
Unicode	12435	U+3093	12531	U+30F3	65437	U+FF9D	110947	U+1B163	110951	U+1B167
UTF-8	227 130 147	E3 82 93	227 131 179	E3 83 B3	239 190 157	EF BE 9D	240 155 133 163	F0 9B 85 A3	240 155 133 167	F0 9B 85 A7
UTF-16	12435	3093	12531	30F3	65437	FF9D	55340 56675	D82C DD63	55340 56679	D82C DD67
Numeric character reference	&#12435;	&#x3093;	&#12531;	&#x30F3;	&#65437;	&#xFF9D;	&#110947;	&#x1B163;	&#110951;	&#x1B167;
Shift JIS	130 241	82 F1	131 147	83 93	221	DD				
EUC-JP	164 243	A4 F3	165 243	A5 F3	142 221	8E DD				
GB 18030	164 243	A4 F3	165 243	A5 F3	132 49 155 55	84 31 9B 37	147 54 134 53	93 36 86 35		
EUC-KR / UHC	170 243	AA F3	171 243	AB F3						
Big5 (non-ETEN kana)	198 247	C6 F7	199 173	C7 AD						
Big5 (ETEN / HKSCS)	199 122	C7 7A	199 239	C7 EF						

N is the only Katakana without a circled form in Unicode.

== Names ==
The kana ん and ン and the various sounds they represent are known by the names hatsuon (撥音) and haneru-on (撥ねる音). One of the various meanings of the verb haneru (撥ねる) is to "make an upward brush-stroke" when writing, which is a gesture that is involved in writing the kana ん and ン. Another meaning is rather specific, to 'pronounce "n" as a syllabic consonant', in other words, to make the sounds represented by the kana ん and ン. It is not clear whether the calligraphic gesture involved in writing the kana or some phonetic gesture involved in producing the sounds gives the names hatsuon and haneru-on. English-language literature favors the descriptive name moraic nasal for the sounds.

Historically, the name hatsuon was not used just for the Japanese moraic nasal, but also for ending nasals in Middle Chinese. The Meiji-era linguist Ōshima Masatake used the terms sokuon ("plosive") and hatsuon ("nasal") to describe ending consonants in Chinese (which he called Shinago (支那語), an outdated term used from the Edo period to after World War II). These sounds were classified as "labial" (唇內, shinnai), "lingual" (舌內, zetsunai) and "guttural" (喉內, kōnai). Hatsuon, in particular, were classified as follows: [m] is the "labial nasal" (唇內撥音), [n] is the "lingual nasal" (舌內撥音), and [ŋ] is the "guttural nasal" (喉內撥音). Another of Ōshima's descriptions even more explicitly related the terms sokuon and hatsuon to the four tones of Middle Chinese.

In earlier stages of Japanese, different realizations of the moraic nasal were actually indicated in writing. For example, during the Heian period (Early Middle Japanese), the "lingual nasal" was spelt differently when followed by a lingual consonant (/n, s/) compared to the "labial nasal" when followed by a labial consonant (/p, b, m/). In both cases, the resulting nasal indicated hatsuonbin (撥音便) (see onbin). After the 11th century, the "lingual" and "labial" realizations were no longer distinguished in writing.

== Use in the Ainu language ==
In the Ainu language, ン is interchangeable with the small katakana ㇴ as a final n.
