= Mi (kana) =

mi

Hiragana	Katakana
- Transliteration: mi
- Hiragana origin: 美
- Katakana origin: 三
- Man'yōgana: 民 彌 美 三 水 見 視 御 未 味 尾 微 身 実 箕
- Spelling kana: 三笠のミ Mikasa no "mi"
- Unicode: U+307F, U+30DF
- Braille: ⠷
- Note: These Man'yōgana originally represented morae with one of two different vowel sounds, which merged in later pronunciation

Mi (hiragana: み, katakana: ミ) is one of the Japanese kana, each of which represents one mora. The hiragana is written in two strokes, while the katakana is made in three. Both represent [mi].

Form	Rōmaji	Hiragana	Katakana
Normal m- (ま行 ma-gyō)	mi	み	ミ
Normal m- (ま行 ma-gyō)	mii, myi mī	みい, みぃ みー, み～	ミイ, ミィ ミー, ミ～
Addition yōon my- (みゃ行 mya-gyō)	mya	みゃ	ミャ
Addition yōon my- (みゃ行 mya-gyō)	myaa myā	みゃあ, みゃぁ みゃー, みゃ～	ミャア, ミャァ ミャー, ミャ～
Addition yōon my- (みゃ行 mya-gyō)	myu	みゅ	ミュ
Addition yōon my- (みゃ行 mya-gyō)	myuu myū	みゅう, みゅぅ みゅー, みゅ～	ミュウ, ミュゥ ミュー, ミュ～
Addition yōon my- (みゃ行 mya-gyō)	myo	みょ	ミョ
Addition yōon my- (みゃ行 mya-gyō)	myou myoo myō	みょう, みょぅ みょお, みょぉ みょー, みょ～	ミョウ, ミョゥ ミョオ, ミョォ ミョー, ミョ～

Other additional forms

Form (my-)
Rōmaji	Hiragana	Katakana
(mya)	(みゃ)	(ミャ)
(myi)	(みぃ)	(ミィ)
(myu)	(みゅ)	(ミュ)
mye myei myee myē	みぇ みぇい, みぇぃ みぇえ みぇー	ミェ ミェイ, ミェィ ミェエ ミェー
(myo)	(みょ)	(ミョ)

== Stroke order ==
Stroke order in writing み

Stroke order in writing ミ

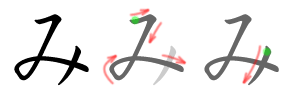
Stroke order in writing み

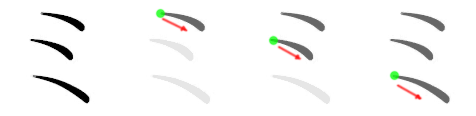
Stroke order in writing ミ

== Other communicative representations ==
Japanese radiotelephony alphabet	Wabun code
三笠のミ; Mikasa no "Mi"	▄▄▄ ▄ ▄ ▄▄▄ ▄ ▄▄▄

Japanese Navy Signal Flag

Japanese semaphore
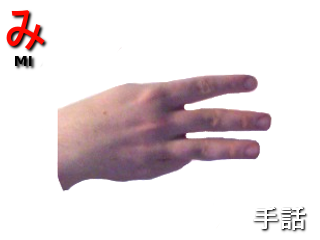
Japanese manual syllabary (fingerspelling)
Braille dots-12356
Japanese Braille

=== Braille forms ===
み / ミ in Japanese Braille		M + Yōon braille					
み / ミ mi	みい / ミー mī	みゃ / ミャ mya	みゃあ / ミャー myā	みゅ / ミュ myu	みゅう / ミュー myū	みょ / ミョ myo	みょう / ミョー myō
⠷ (braille pattern dots-12356)	⠷ (braille pattern dots-12356) ⠒ (braille pattern dots-25)	⠈ (braille pattern dots-4) ⠵ (braille pattern dots-1356)	⠈ (braille pattern dots-4) ⠵ (braille pattern dots-1356) ⠒ (braille pattern dots-25)	⠈ (braille pattern dots-4) ⠽ (braille pattern dots-13456)	⠈ (braille pattern dots-4) ⠽ (braille pattern dots-13456) ⠒ (braille pattern dots-25)	⠈ (braille pattern dots-4) ⠾ (braille pattern dots-23456)	⠈ (braille pattern dots-4) ⠾ (braille pattern dots-23456) ⠒ (braille pattern dots-25)

=== Computer encodings ===
Character information
Preview	み		ミ		ﾐ		㋯	
Unicode name	HIRAGANA LETTER MI		KATAKANA LETTER MI		HALFWIDTH KATAKANA LETTER MI		CIRCLED KATAKANA MI	
Encodings	decimal	hex	dec	hex	dec	hex	dec	hex
Unicode	12415	U+307F	12511	U+30DF	65424	U+FF90	13039	U+32EF
UTF-8	227 129 191	E3 81 BF	227 131 159	E3 83 9F	239 190 144	EF BE 90	227 139 175	E3 8B AF
Numeric character reference	&#12415;	&#x307F;	&#12511;	&#x30DF;	&#65424;	&#xFF90;	&#13039;	&#x32EF;
Shift JIS	130 221	82 DD	131 126	83 7E	208	D0		
EUC-JP	164 223	A4 DF	165 223	A5 DF	142 208	8E D0		
GB 18030	164 223	A4 DF	165 223	A5 DF	132 49 154 52	84 31 9A 34		
EUC-KR / UHC	170 223	AA DF	171 223	AB DF				
Big5 (non-ETEN kana)	198 227	C6 E3	199 119	C7 77				
Big5 (ETEN / HKSCS)	199 102	C7 66	199 219	C7 DB				
