= Chi (kana) =

chi

| Hiragana | Katakana |
- Transliteration: chi, ti
- Translit. with dakuten: ji, dji, di
- Hiragana origin: 知
- Katakana origin: 千
- Man'yōgana: 知 智 陳 千 乳 血 茅
- Voiced man'yōgana: 遅 治 地 恥 尼 泥
- Spelling kana: 千鳥のチ (Chidori no "chi")

Chi (hiragana: ち, katakana: チ) is one of the Japanese kana, which each represent one mora. Both are phonemically /ti/, reflected in the Nihon-shiki and Kunrei-shiki romanization ti, although, for phonological reasons, the actual pronunciation is [t͡ɕi], which is reflected in the Hepburn romanization chi.

The kanji for one thousand (千, sen), appears similar to チ, and at one time they were related, but today チ is used as phonetic, while the kanji carries an entirely unrelated meaning.

Many onomatopoeic words beginning with ち pertain to things that are small or quick.

The dakuten forms ぢ, ヂ, are uncommon. They are primarily used for indicating a voiced consonant in the middle of a compound word (see rendaku), and they don't usually begin a word. The dakuten form of the shi character is sometimes used when transliterating "di", as opposed to チ's dakuten form; for example, Aladdin is written as アラジン Arajin, and radio is written as ラジオ. It is, however, more common to use ディ instead, such as ディオン to translate the name Dion.

In the Ainu language, チ by itself is pronounced [t͡s], and can be combined with the katakana ヤ, ユ, エ, and ヨ to write the other [t͡s] sounds. The combination チェ (pronounced [t͡se]), is interchangeable with セ゚.

| Form | Rōmaji | Hiragana | Katakana |
|---|---|---|---|
| Normal ch-/t- (た行 ta-gyō) | chi | ち | チ |
| Normal ch-/t- (た行 ta-gyō) | chii, chyi chī | ちい, ちぃ ちー | チイ, チィ チー |
| Addition yōon ch-/ty- (ちゃ行 cha-gyō) | cha | ちゃ | チャ |
| Addition yōon ch-/ty- (ちゃ行 cha-gyō) | chaa chā | ちゃあ, ちゃぁ ちゃー | チャア, チャァ チャー |
| Addition yōon ch-/ty- (ちゃ行 cha-gyō) | chu | ちゅ | チュ |
| Addition yōon ch-/ty- (ちゃ行 cha-gyō) | chuu, chwu chū | ちゅう, ちゅぅ ちゅー | チュウ, チュゥ チュー |
| Addition yōon ch-/ty- (ちゃ行 cha-gyō) | cho | ちょ | チョ |
| Addition yōon ch-/ty- (ちゃ行 cha-gyō) | chou choo chō | ちょう, ちょぅ ちょお, ちょぉ ちょー | チョウ, チョゥ チョオ, チョォ チョー |
| Addition dakuten d-/j- (だ行 da-gyō) | ji | ぢ | ヂ |
| Addition dakuten d-/j- (だ行 da-gyō) | jii, jyi jī | ぢい, ぢぃ ぢー | ヂイ, ヂィ ヂー |
| Addition yōon and dakuten dy-/j- (ぢゃ行 dya-gyō) | ja | ぢゃ | ヂャ |
| Addition yōon and dakuten dy-/j- (ぢゃ行 dya-gyō) | jaa jā | ぢゃあ, ぢゃぁ ぢゃー | ヂャア, ヂャァ ヂャー |
| Addition yōon and dakuten dy-/j- (ぢゃ行 dya-gyō) | ju | ぢゅ | ヂュ |
| Addition yōon and dakuten dy-/j- (ぢゃ行 dya-gyō) | juu, jwu jū | ぢゅう, ぢゅぅ ぢゅー | ヂュウ, ヂュゥ ヂュー |
| Addition yōon and dakuten dy-/j- (ぢゃ行 dya-gyō) | jo | ぢょ | ヂョ |
| Addition yōon and dakuten dy-/j- (ぢゃ行 dya-gyō) | jou joo jō | ぢょう, ぢょぅ ぢょお, ぢょぉ ぢょー | ヂョウ, ヂョゥ ヂョオ, ヂョォ ヂョー |

Other additional forms

Form A (ch-/chw-)
| Romaji | Hiragana | Katakana |
|---|---|---|
| (cha) | (ちゃ) | (チャ) |
| (chyi) | (ちぃ) | (チィ) |
| (chu) | (ちゅ) | (チュ) |
| che chei chee chē | ちぇ ちぇい, ちぇぃ ちぇえ ちぇー | チェ チェイ, チェィ チェエ チェー |
| (cho) | (ちょ) | (チョ) |
| chwa | ちゅぁ, ちゎ | チュァ, チヮ |
| chwi | ちゅぃ | チュィ |
| (chwu) | (ちゅぅ) | (チュゥ) |
| chwe | ちゅぇ | チュェ |
| chwo | ちゅぉ | チュォ |

Form B (dy-/j-/jw-)
| Romaji | Hiragana | Katakana |
|---|---|---|
| (dya, ja) | (ぢゃ) | (ヂャ) |
| (dyi, jyi) | (ぢぃ) | (ヂィ) |
| (dyu, ju) | (ぢゅ) | (ヂュ) |
| dye, je dyei, jei dyee, jee dyē, jē | ぢぇ ぢぇい, ぢぇぃ ぢぇえ ぢぇー | ヂェ ヂェイ, ヂェィ ヂェエ ヂェー |
| (dyo, jo) | (ぢょ) | (ヂョ) |
| jwa | ぢゅぁ, ぢゎ | ヂュァ, ヂヮ |
| jwi | ぢゅぃ | ヂュィ |
| (jwu) | (ぢゅぅ) | (ヂュゥ) |
| jwe | ぢゅぇ | ヂュェ |
| jwo | ぢゅぉ | ヂュォ |

== Stroke order ==
Stroke order in writing ち

Stroke order in writing チ

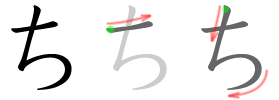
Stroke order in writing ち

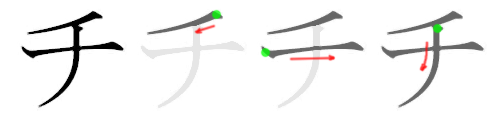
Stroke order in writing チ

== Other communicative representations ==
| Japanese radiotelephony alphabet | Wabun code |
| 千鳥のチ; Chidori no "Chi" | ▄ ▄ ▄▄▄ ▄ |

Japanese Navy Signal Flag

Japanese semaphore
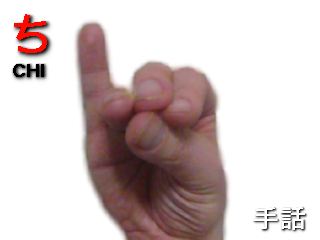
Japanese manual syllabary (fingerspelling)
Braille dots-1235
Japanese Braille

=== Braille forms ===
| ち / チ in Japanese Braille | | | | Ch/J/Dy + Yōon braille | | | |
|---|---|---|---|---|---|---|---|
| ち / チ chi | ぢ / ヂ ji/di | ちい / チー chī | ぢい / ヂー jī/dī | ちゃ / チャ cha | ぢゃ / ヂャ ja/dya | ちゃあ / チャー chā | ぢゃあ / ヂャー jā/dya |
| ⠗ (braille pattern dots-1235) | ⠐ (braille pattern dots-5) ⠗ (braille pattern dots-1235) | ⠗ (braille pattern dots-1235) ⠒ (braille pattern dots-25) | ⠐ (braille pattern dots-5) ⠗ (braille pattern dots-1235) ⠒ (braille pattern dots-25) | ⠈ (braille pattern dots-4) ⠕ (braille pattern dots-135) | ⠘ (braille pattern dots-45) ⠕ (braille pattern dots-135) | ⠈ (braille pattern dots-4) ⠕ (braille pattern dots-135) ⠒ (braille pattern dots-25) | ⠘ (braille pattern dots-45) ⠕ (braille pattern dots-135) ⠒ (braille pattern dots-25) |
Ch/J/Dy + Yōon braille
| ちゅ / チュ chu | ぢゅ / ヂュ ju/dyu | ちゅう / チュー chū | ぢゅう / ヂュー jū/dyū | ちょ / チョ cho | ぢょ / ヂョ jo/dyo | ちょう / チョー chō | ぢょう / ヂョー jō/dyō |
| ⠈ (braille pattern dots-4) ⠝ (braille pattern dots-1345) | ⠘ (braille pattern dots-45) ⠝ (braille pattern dots-1345) | ⠈ (braille pattern dots-4) ⠝ (braille pattern dots-1345) ⠒ (braille pattern dots-25) | ⠘ (braille pattern dots-45) ⠝ (braille pattern dots-1345) ⠒ (braille pattern dots-25) | ⠈ (braille pattern dots-4) ⠞ (braille pattern dots-2345) | ⠘ (braille pattern dots-45) ⠞ (braille pattern dots-2345) | ⠈ (braille pattern dots-4) ⠞ (braille pattern dots-2345) ⠒ (braille pattern dots-25) | ⠘ (braille pattern dots-45) ⠞ (braille pattern dots-2345) ⠒ (braille pattern dots-25) |

=== Computer encodings ===
Character information
| Preview | ち | | チ | | ﾁ | | ぢ | | ヂ | | ㋠ | |
|---|---|---|---|---|---|---|---|---|---|---|---|---|
| Unicode name | HIRAGANA LETTER TI | | KATAKANA LETTER TI | | HALFWIDTH KATAKANA LETTER TI | | HIRAGANA LETTER DI | | KATAKANA LETTER DI | | CIRCLED KATAKANA TI | |
| Encodings | decimal | hex | dec | hex | dec | hex | dec | hex | dec | hex | dec | hex |
| Unicode | 12385 | U+3061 | 12481 | U+30C1 | 65409 | U+FF81 | 12386 | U+3062 | 12482 | U+30C2 | 13024 | U+32E0 |
| UTF-8 | 227 129 161 | E3 81 A1 | 227 131 129 | E3 83 81 | 239 190 129 | EF BE 81 | 227 129 162 | E3 81 A2 | 227 131 130 | E3 83 82 | 227 139 160 | E3 8B A0 |
| Numeric character reference | &#12385; | &#x3061; | &#12481; | &#x30C1; | &#65409; | &#xFF81; | &#12386; | &#x3062; | &#12482; | &#x30C2; | &#13024; | &#x32E0; |
| Shift JIS | 130 191 | 82 BF | 131 96 | 83 60 | 193 | C1 | 130 192 | 82 C0 | 131 97 | 83 61 | | |
| EUC-JP | 164 193 | A4 C1 | 165 193 | A5 C1 | 142 193 | 8E C1 | 164 194 | A4 C2 | 165 194 | A5 C2 | | |
| GB 18030 | 164 193 | A4 C1 | 165 193 | A5 C1 | 132 49 152 57 | 84 31 98 39 | 164 194 | A4 C2 | 165 194 | A5 C2 | | |
| EUC-KR / UHC | 170 193 | AA C1 | 171 193 | AB C1 | | | 170 194 | AA C2 | 171 194 | AB C2 | | |
| Big5 (non-ETEN kana) | 198 197 | C6 C5 | 199 89 | C7 59 | | | 198 198 | C6 C6 | 199 90 | C7 5A | | |
| Big5 (ETEN / HKSCS) | 199 72 | C7 48 | 199 189 | C7 BD | | | 199 73 | C7 49 | 199 190 | C7 BE | | |

== See also ==
- Shi (kana)
- Hepburn romanization
- Kunrei-shiki romanization
