= Shi (kana) =

shi

Hiragana	Katakana
- Transliteration: shi, si
- Translit. with dakuten: ji, zi
- Hiragana origin: 之
- Katakana origin: 之
- Man'yōgana: 子 之 芝 水 四 司 詞 斯 志 思 信 偲 寺 侍 時 歌 詩 師 紫 新 旨 指 次 此 死 事 准 磯 為
- Voiced man'yōgana: 自 士 仕 司 時 尽 慈 耳 餌 児 弐 爾
- Spelling kana: 新聞のシ (Shinbun no "shi")

Shi (hiragana: し, katakana: シ) is one of the Japanese kana, which each represent one mora. Both represent the phonemes /si/, reflected in the Nihon-shiki and Kunrei-shiki romanization si, although for phonological reasons, the actual pronunciation is [ɕi], which is reflected in the Hepburn romanization shi. The shapes of these kana have origins in the character 之. The katakana form has become increasingly popular as an emoticon in the Western world due to its resemblance to a smiling face.

This character may be combined with a dakuten, forming じ in hiragana, ジ in katakana, and ji in Hepburn romanization; the pronunciation becomes /zi/ (phonetically [d͡ʑi] or [ʑi] in the middle of words).

The dakuten form of this character is used when transliterating "di" occasionally, as opposed to チ's dakuten form, or a de assigned to a small i; for example, Aladdin is written as アラジン Arajin, and radio is written as ラジオ.

In the Ainu language, シ is used to represent the ʃi sound. It can also be written as a small ㇱ to represent a final s sound, pronounced ɕ.

Form		Rōmaji	Hiragana	Katakana
normal	sh- alone (さ行 sa-gyō)	shi shii, shyi shī	し しい, しぃ しー	シ シイ, シィ シー
normal	sh- and yōon (しゃ行 sha-gyō)	sha shaa shā	しゃ しゃあ, しゃぁ しゃー	シャ シャア, シャァ シャー
normal	sh- and yōon (しゃ行 sha-gyō)	shu shuu, shwu shū	しゅ しゅう, しゅぅ しゅー	シュ シュウ, シュゥ シュー
normal	sh- and yōon (しゃ行 sha-gyō)	sho shou shoo shō	しょ しょう, しょぅ しょお, しょぉ しょー	ショ ショウ, ショゥ ショオ, ショォ ショー
with dakuten	j- alone (ザ行 za-gyō)	ji jii, jyi jī	じ じい, じぃ じー	ジ ジイ, ジィ ジー
with dakuten	j- and yōon (じゃ行 ja-gyō)	ja jaa jā	じゃ じゃあ, じゃぁ じゃー	ジャ ジャア, ジャァ ジャー
with dakuten	j- and yōon (じゃ行 ja-gyō)	ju juu, jwu jū	じゅ じゅう, じゅぅ じゅー	ジュ ジュウ, ジュゥ ジュー
with dakuten	j- and yōon (じゃ行 ja-gyō)	jo jou joo jō	じょ じょう, じょぅ じょお, じょぉ じょー	ジョ ジョウ, ジョゥ ジョオ, ジョォ ジョー

Other additional forms

Form A (sh-/sy-/shw-)
Romaji	Hiragana	Katakana
(sha, sya)	(しゃ)	(シャ)
(shyi, syi)	(しぃ)	(シィ)
(shu, syu)	(しゅ)	(シュ)
she, sye shee, syee shei, syei shē, syē	しぇ しぇえ しぇい, しぇぃ しぇー	シェ シェエ シェイ, シェィ シェー
(sho, syo)	(しょ)	(ショ)
shwa	しゅぁ, しゎ	シュァ, シヮ
shwi	しゅぃ	シュィ
(shwu)	(しゅぅ)	(シュゥ)
shwe	しゅぇ	シュェ
shwo	しゅぉ	シュォ

Form B (j-/zy-/jw-)
Romaji	Hiragana	Katakana
(ja, zya)	(じゃ)	(ジャ)
(jyi, zyi)	(じぃ)	(ジィ)
(ju, zyu)	(じゅ)	(ジュ)
je, zye jee, zyee jei, zyei jē, zyē	じぇ じぇえ じぇい, じぇぃ じぇー	ジェ ジェエ ジェイ, ジェィ ジェー
(jo, zyo)	(じょ)	(ジョ)
jwa	じゅぁ, じゎ	ジュァ, ジヮ
jwi	じゅぃ	ジュィ
(jwu)	(じゅぅ)	(ジュゥ)
jwe	じゅぇ	ジュェ
jwo	じゅぉ	ジュォ

== Stroke order ==
Stroke order in writing し

Stroke order in writing シ

Stroke order in writing Hiragana し

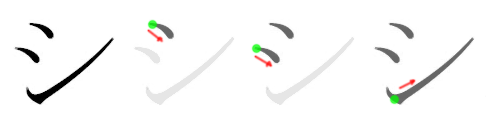
Stroke order in writing Katakana シ

== Other communicative representations ==
Japanese radiotelephony alphabet	Wabun code
新聞のシ; Shinbun no "Shi"	▄▄▄ ▄▄▄ ▄ ▄▄▄ ▄

Japanese Navy Signal Flag

Japanese semaphore
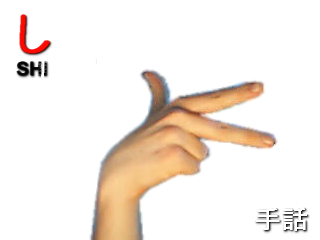
Japanese manual syllabary (fingerspelling)
Braille dots-1256
Japanese Braille

=== Braille forms ===
し / シ in Japanese Braille				Sh/J + Yōon braille			
し / シ shi	じ / ジ ji	しい / シー shī	じい / ジー jī	しゃ / シャ sha	じゃ / ジャ ja	しゃあ / シャー shā	じゃあ / ジャー jā
⠳ (braille pattern dots-1256)	⠐ (braille pattern dots-5) ⠳ (braille pattern dots-1256)	⠳ (braille pattern dots-1256) ⠒ (braille pattern dots-25)	⠐ (braille pattern dots-5) ⠳ (braille pattern dots-1256) ⠒ (braille pattern dots-25)	⠈ (braille pattern dots-4) ⠱ (braille pattern dots-156)	⠘ (braille pattern dots-45) ⠱ (braille pattern dots-156)	⠈ (braille pattern dots-4) ⠱ (braille pattern dots-156) ⠒ (braille pattern dots-25)	⠘ (braille pattern dots-45) ⠱ (braille pattern dots-156) ⠒ (braille pattern dots-25)
Sh/J + Yōon braille
しゅ / シュ shu	じゅ / ジュ ju	しゅう / シュー shū	じゅう / ジュー jū	しょ / ショ sho	じょ / ジョ jo	しょう / ショー shō	じょう / ジョー jō
⠈ (braille pattern dots-4) ⠹ (braille pattern dots-1456)	⠘ (braille pattern dots-45) ⠹ (braille pattern dots-1456)	⠈ (braille pattern dots-4) ⠹ (braille pattern dots-1456) ⠒ (braille pattern dots-25)	⠘ (braille pattern dots-45) ⠹ (braille pattern dots-1456) ⠒ (braille pattern dots-25)	⠈ (braille pattern dots-4) ⠺ (braille pattern dots-2456)	⠘ (braille pattern dots-45) ⠺ (braille pattern dots-2456)	⠈ (braille pattern dots-4) ⠺ (braille pattern dots-2456) ⠒ (braille pattern dots-25)	⠘ (braille pattern dots-45) ⠺ (braille pattern dots-2456) ⠒ (braille pattern dots-25)

=== Computer encodings ===
Character information
Preview	し		シ		ｼ		㋛	
Unicode name	HIRAGANA LETTER SI		KATAKANA LETTER SI		HALFWIDTH KATAKANA LETTER SI		CIRCLED KATAKANA SI	
Encodings	decimal	hex	dec	hex	dec	hex	dec	hex
Unicode	12375	U+3057	12471	U+30B7	65404	U+FF7C	13019	U+32DB
UTF-8	227 129 151	E3 81 97	227 130 183	E3 82 B7	239 189 188	EF BD BC	227 139 155	E3 8B 9B
Numeric character reference	&#12375;	&#x3057;	&#12471;	&#x30B7;	&#65404;	&#xFF7C;	&#13019;	&#x32DB;
Shift JIS	130 181	82 B5	131 86	83 56	188	BC		
EUC-JP	164 183	A4 B7	165 183	A5 B7	142 188	8E BC		
GB 18030	164 183	A4 B7	165 183	A5 B7	132 49 152 52	84 31 98 34		
EUC-KR / UHC	170 183	AA B7	171 183	AB B7				
Big5 (non-ETEN kana)	198 187	C6 BB	199 79	C7 4F				
Big5 (ETEN / HKSCS)	198 253	C6 FD	199 179	C7 B3				

Character information
Preview	ㇱ		じ		ジ	
Unicode name	KATAKANA LETTER SMALL SI		HIRAGANA LETTER ZI		KATAKANA LETTER ZI	
Encodings	decimal	hex	dec	hex	dec	hex
Unicode	12785	U+31F1	12376	U+3058	12472	U+30B8
UTF-8	227 135 177	E3 87 B1	227 129 152	E3 81 98	227 130 184	E3 82 B8
Numeric character reference	&#12785;	&#x31F1;	&#12376;	&#x3058;	&#12472;	&#x30B8;
Shift JIS (plain)			130 182	82 B6	131 87	83 57
Shift JIS-2004	131 237	83 ED	130 182	82 B6	131 87	83 57
EUC-JP (plain)			164 184	A4 B8	165 184	A5 B8
EUC-JIS-2004	166 239	A6 EF	164 184	A4 B8	165 184	A5 B8
GB 18030	129 57 188 53	81 39 BC 35	164 184	A4 B8	165 184	A5 B8
EUC-KR / UHC			170 184	AA B8	171 184	AB B8
Big5 (non-ETEN kana)			198 188	C6 BC	199 80	C7 50
Big5 (ETEN / HKSCS)			198 254	C6 FE	199 180	C7 B4
