= Yōon =

Feature of the Japanese language

The yōon (Japanese: 拗音 (ようおん)) is a feature of the Japanese language in which a mora is formed with an added [j] sound (i.e., palatalized) or, more rarely in the modern language, with an added [w] sound (i.e., labialized).

Yōon are represented in hiragana using a kana ending in i, such as き (ki) or に (ni), plus a smaller version of one of the three y kana: や (ya), ゆ (yu), or よ (yo). For example, 今日 (kyō, 'today') is written きょう [kʲoː] using a small version of the よ kana. Contrast this with 器用 (kiyō, 'skillful'), which is written きよう [kijoː] with a full-sized よ kana. In historical kana orthography, yōon were not clearly identifiable with the smaller kana and had to be determined by context.

In earlier stages of Japanese and in certain dialects yōon can also be formed with the kana wa, wi, we, and wo — for example, くゎ/クヮ (kwa), くゐ/クヰ (kwi), くゑ/クヱ (kwe), くを/クヲ (kwo). Although obsolete in modern Japanese, kwa and kwi can still be found in several of the Ryukyuan languages (e.g., Okinawan) today, while kwe is formed with the digraph くぇ. Kwa also appears in the Kagoshima dialect. Instead of the kana き, these are formed with the kana for ku, く/ク. Some older transliterations in English follow the earlier pronunciation (e.g., Kwaidan, Kwannon), and such yōon may appear in loanwords like ムジカ・アンティクヮ・ケルン ("Musica Antiqua Köln"). They were also used to write Hakka in Taiwan under Japanese rule (called Cantonese kana).

== Table ==
Yōon 拗音

Katakana
	ャ ya	ュ yu	ョ yo
キ ki	キャ kya	キュ kyu	キョ kyo
シ shi	シャ sha	シュ shu	ショ sho
チ chi	チャ cha	チュ chu	チョ cho
ニ ni	ニャ nya	ニュ nyu	ニョ nyo
ヒ hi	ヒャ hya	ヒュ hyu	ヒョ hyo
ミ mi	ミャ mya	ミュ myu	ミョ myo
リ ri	リャ rya	リュ ryu	リョ ryo
Dakuten
ギ gi	ギャ gya	ギュ gyu	ギョ gyo
ジ ji	ジャ ja	ジュ ju	ジョ jo
ヂ ji	ヂャ ja	ヂュ ju	ヂョ jo
ビ bi	ビャ bya	ビュ byu	ビョ byo
Handakuten
ピ pi	ピャ pya	ピュ pyu	ピョ pyo

Hiragana
	ゃ ya	ゅ yu	ょ yo
き ki	きゃ kya	きゅ kyu	きょ kyo
し shi	しゃ sha	しゅ shu	しょ sho
ち chi	ちゃ cha	ちゅ chu	ちょ cho
に ni	にゃ nya	にゅ nyu	にょ nyo
ひ hi	ひゃ hya	ひゅ hyu	ひょ hyo
み mi	みゃ mya	みゅ myu	みょ myo
り ri	りゃ rya	りゅ ryu	りょ ryo
Dakuten
ぎ gi	ぎゃ gya	ぎゅ gyu	ぎょ gyo
じ ji	じゃ ja	じゅ ju	じょ jo
ぢ ji	ぢゃ ja	ぢゅ ju	ぢょ jo
び bi	びゃ bya	びゅ byu	びょ byo
Handakuten
ぴ pi	ぴゃ pya	ぴゅ pyu	ぴょ pyo

Gō Yōon (合拗音; Closed Yōon) – Obsolete
	ゎ wa	ゐ wi	ゑ we
く ku	くゎ kwa	(くゐ) kwi	(くゑ) kwe
ぐ gu	ぐゎ gwa	(ぐゐ) gwi	(ぐゑ) gwe

== Other representations ==
Braille
Yōon	Yōon + Dakuten	Yōon + Handakuten	-w-
⠈ (braille pattern dots-4)	⠘ (braille pattern dots-45)	⠨ (braille pattern dots-46)	⠢ (braille pattern dots-26)

In Japanese Braille, Yōon is indicated with one of the yōon, yōon+dakuten, or yōon+handakuten prefixes.

Unlike in kana, Braille yōon is prefixed to the -a/-u/-o morae, rather than appending ya, yu, or yo to an -i kana (e.g., kyu: きゅ - ki + yu → ⠈⠩ - yōon + ku). Likewise, the -w- morae are indicated by a prefix of the -a/-i/-e/-o morae, rather than an -u mora (e.g., くぁ / くゎ (kwa) = -w- + ka: ⠢⠡).
