= Unified Hangul Code =

Windows character set for Korean

- Layout of the Unified Hangul Code
- Alias(es): Windows Code Page 949; IBM Code Page 1363
- Language: Korean
- Standard: WHATWG Encoding Standard (as "EUC-KR")
- Classification: Extended ISO 646 (Note: Not in the strictest sense of the term, as ASCII bytes can appear as trail bytes, although this is limited to letter bytes.); variable-width encoding; CJK encoding
- Extends: EUC-KR
- Other related encodings: KPS 9566-2003; KPS 9566-2011

Unified Hangul Code (UHC), (Note: Korean: 통합형 한글 코드; RR: Tonghabhyeong Hangeul Kodeu) or Extended Wansung, (Note: Korean: 확장 완성형; RR: Hwagjang Wanseonghyeong) also known under Microsoft Windows as Code Page 949 (Windows-949, MS949 or ambiguously CP949), is the Microsoft Windows code page for the Korean language. It is an extension of Wansung Code (KS C 5601:1987, encoded as EUC-KR) to include all 11172 non-partial Hangul syllables present in Johab (KS C 5601:1992 annex 3). This corresponds to the pre-composed syllables available in Unicode 2.0 and later.

Wansung Code has the drawback that it only assigns codes for the 2350 precomposed Hangul syllables which have their own KS X 1001 (KS C 5601) codepoints (out of 11172 in total, not counting those using obsolete jamo), and requires others to use eight-byte composition sequences, which are not supported by some partial implementations of the standard. UHC resolves this by assigning single codes for all possible syllables constructed using modern jamo, by making assignments outside of the encoding space used for KS X 1001.

The lead byte range is extended to 0x81–FE, and the trail byte range is extended to 0x41–5A, 0x61–7A and 0x81–FE (in EUC-KR, both ranges are 0xA1–FE). The codes outside the EUC-KR ranges are used for the additional hangul. If considered separately, both the EUC-KR Hangul block and the UHC extended Hangul section are in Unicode order.

== Terminology ==
Unified Hangul Code is not registered with IANA as a standard to communicate information over the Internet. Alternatives include UTF-8. However, the W3C/WHATWG Encoding Standard used by HTML5 incorporates the Unified Hangul Code extensions into its definition of "EUC-KR".

Microsoft assigns Windows-949 the label "ks_c_5601-1987", which properly applies to KS X 1001 itself (KS C 5601 being the original name of KS X 1001). The WHATWG treat the label "ks_c_5601-1987" interchangeably with "EUC-KR" with the intent of being "compatible with deployed content". The Unicode Consortium's "OBSOLETE/EASTASIA" collection of withdrawn mappings included mappings for Unified Hangul Code as "KSC5601.TXT", with the automatically derived mappings for 7-bit KS X 1001 being included as "KSX1001.TXT".

IBM's code page 949 is another, otherwise unrelated, extension of EUC-KR. International Components for Unicode (ICU) uses "cp949", "949" or "ibm-949" to refer to that IBM code page, and "ms949" or "windows-949" (or several variants of "ks_c_5601-1987") to refer to the Windows mapping of UHC. Python, by contrast, recognises "cp949", "949", "ms949" and "uhc" as labels for UHC, and does not include an IBM-949 codec. Out of the labels incorporating the code page number, the WHATWG recognise only "windows-949".

IBM's code page for Unified Hangul Code is called Code page 1363 (IBM-1363), or "Korean MS-Win". It is a combination of SBCS Code page 1126 and DBCS Code page 1362. It differs in having a single byte mapping of 0x5C to the Won sign (U+20A9); Windows maps 0x5C to U+005C (the Unicode code point for the backslash) as in ASCII, although fonts often still render it as a Won sign. Unicode mapping of the wave dash (0xA1AD) also differs, with the IBM mapping favouring U+301C, while the Microsoft mapping favours U+223C (Tilde Operator). The IBM mapping for UHC is available as "ibm-1363" in ICU, whereas the ICU "windows-949" codec is referred to as IBM-1261 in some ICU source code comments.

== Single byte codes ==
Following is the single-byte portion of the code page as defined by IBM. Similarly to Code page 437, the control code bytes may be used as control codes or graphical codes depending on context—the graphical codes are shown below. Microsoft uses ASCII mappings for all ASCII bytes, although the backslash may still be rendered as a won sign.

Code page 1126
	0	1	2	3	4	5	6	7	8	9	A	B	C	D	E	F
0x	NUL	┌	┐	└	┘	│	─	•	◘	○	◙	♂	♀	♪	♫	☼
1x	┼	◄	↕	‼	¶	┴	┬	┤	↑	├	→	←	∟	↔	▲	▼
2x	SP	!	"	#	$	%	&	'	(	)	*	+	,	-	.	/
3x	0	1	2	3	4	5	6	7	8	9	:	;	<	=	>	?
4x	@	A	B	C	D	E	F	G	H	I	J	K	L	M	N	O
5x	P	Q	R	S	T	U	V	W	X	Y	Z	[	₩	]		_
6x	`	a	b	c	d	e	f	g	h	i	j	k	l	m	n	o
7x	p	q	r	s	t	u	v	w	x	y	z	{	|	}	~	⌂

Differences from code page 437
