= Arial Unicode MS =

Neo-grotesque sans-serif typeface

- Category: Sans-serif
- Classification: Neo-grotesque sans-serif
- Designers: Brian Allen, Evert Bloemsma, Jelle Bosma, Joshua Hadley, Wallace Ho, Kamal Mansour, Steve Matteson, Thomas Rickner
- Commissioned by: Microsoft
- Foundry: Monotype
- Date created: 1993–1999
- Date released: 1998
- Design based on: Arial
- Trademark: Monotype Imaging

Arial Unicode MS is a TrueType font and the extended version of the font Arial. Compared to Arial, it includes higher line height, omits kerning pairs and adds enough glyphs to cover a large subset of Unicode 2.1—thus supporting most Microsoft code pages, but also requiring much more storage space (22 megabytes). It also adds Ideographic layout tables, but unlike Arial, it mandates no smoothing in the 14–18 point range, and contains Roman (upright) glyphs only; there is no oblique (italic) version. Arial Unicode MS was previously distributed with Microsoft Office, but this ended in 2016 version. It is bundled with Mac OS X v10.5 and later. It may also be purchased separately (as Arial Unicode) from Ascender Corporation, who licenses the font from Microsoft.

When rendered with the same engine and without making adjustments for the different font metrics, the glyphs that appear in both Arial and Arial Unicode MS appear to be slightly wider, and thus rounder, in Arial Unicode MS. Horizontal text may also appear to have more inter-line spacing in Arial Unicode MS. This is due to larger bounding boxes (Arial Unicode MS needs more room for some of its extended glyphs) and the limitations of renderers, not changes in the glyph shapes. The lack of kerning pairs in Arial Unicode MS may also affect inter-glyph spacing in some renderers (for example the Adobe Flash Player).

Arial Unicode MS also includes Hebrew glyphs different from the Hebrew glyphs found in Arial. They are based on the shapes of the Hebrew glyphs in Tahoma, but are adjusted to the weight, proportions and style of Arial.

== History and availability ==
Arial was designed by Robin Nicholas and Patricia Saunders in 1982 and was released as TrueType font in 1990. From 1993 to 1999, it was extended as Arial Unicode MS (with its first release as a TrueType font in 1998) by the following members of Monotype Typography's Monotype Type Drawing Office, under contract to Microsoft: Brian Allen, Evert Bloemsma, Jelle Bosma, Joshua Hadley, Wallace Ho, Kamal Mansour, Steve Matteson, and Thomas Rickner.

From mid-2001 through mid-2002, Arial Unicode MS was also available as a separate download for licensed users of the standalone version of Microsoft Publisher 2000 SR-1, which did not ship with the font. The freely downloadable version was withdrawn after Microsoft Publisher 2002, which included the font, began shipping. The withdrawal coincided with the withdrawal of the free downloads of Microsoft's "Core fonts for the Web". Numerous companies, organizations, educational establishments and even governments were directing users to the download without referencing the need for a valid Publisher or Office license or any Microsoft operating system.

Monotype Imaging still owns the Arial and Arial Unicode MS trademarks, but Microsoft once retained exclusive licensing rights to the fonts.

On 11 April 2005, Ascender Corporation announced it had entered an agreement with Microsoft which enables Ascender to distribute Microsoft fonts, including the Windows Core Fonts, the Microsoft Web Fonts and the many multilingual fonts currently supplied by Microsoft. Called Arial Unicode, it is sold for approximately $99 per 5 users.

The font is also apparently licensed to Apple, who announced on October 16, 2007 that their flagship operating system, Mac OS X v10.5 ("Leopard"), would be bundled with Arial Unicode. Leopard also ships with several other previously Microsoft-only fonts, including Microsoft Sans Serif, Tahoma and Wingdings.

Monotype Imaging currently also licenses Arial Unicode on its own. It was also bundled by Monotype as part of iPhone Compatibility Font Set.

Arial Unicode MS is no longer available in Microsoft Office 2016, as it has been judged to no longer be suitable as a fallback font.

=== Versions ===
Version 0.84 was supplied with Microsoft Office 2000 and the standalone versions of that suite's applications—except Publisher 2000 SR-1. It includes 51,180 glyphs (38,911 characters), supports 32 code pages, and contains Latin and Han Ideographic OpenType layout tables. The code pages supported are 1250 (Latin 2: East Europe), 1251 (Cyrillic), 1252 (Latin 1), 1253 (Greek), 1254 (Turkish), 1255 (Hebrew), 1256 (Arabic), 1257 (Windows Baltic), Code page 1258 (Vietnamese), 437 (US), 708 (Arabic; ASMO 708), 737 (Greek), 775 (MS-DOS Baltic), 850 (WE/Latin 1), 852 (Latin 2), 855 (IBM Cyrillic; primarily Russian), 857 (MS-DOS IBM Turkish), 860 (MS-DOS Portuguese), 861 (MS-DOS Icelandic), 862 (Hebrew), 863 (MS-DOS Canadian French), 864 (Arabic), 865 (MS-DOS Nordic), 866 (MS-DOS Russian), 869 (IBM Greek), 874 (Thai), 932 (ShiftJIS/Japan), 936 (Chinese: Simplified), 949 (Korean Wansung), 950 (Chinese: Traditional), "Macintosh Character Set" (US Roman), and "Windows OEM Character Set". It covers all code points containing non-control characters in Unicode 2.0 and allows only preview and print embedding.

Version 0.86 has the same coverage and support as 0.84.

Versions 1.00 and 1.01 were supplied with Microsoft Office 2002 (Microsoft Office XP), Microsoft Office 2003 and the standalone versions of those suites' applications. It includes 50,377 glyphs (38,917 characters), which reduces Combining Diacritical Marks to 72, increases Miscellaneous Technical characters to 123, increases Private Use Area characters to 43, reduces Spacing Modifier Letters to 57. Code page 1361 (Korean Johab) was added. It adds layout tables for Devanagari, Gujarati, Gurmukhi, Kana (Hiragana & Katakana), Kannada, and Tamil. Its Han Ideographic tables were updated to support vertical writing. It covers all code points containing non-control characters in Unicode 2.1 and allows editable embedding.

== Bugs ==
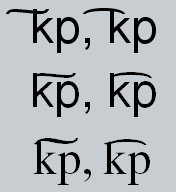
Demonstration of the double-width diacritic bug in Arial Unicode MS. The first row shows how Arial Unicode MS incorrectly renders a diacritic that is correctly placed between the letters "k" and "p". The second row shows how the diacritic is rendered in the correct position only if placed after the "p". The third row shows how the correct placement is rendered in TITUS Cyberbit Basic, which does not have the bug.

All versions of Arial Unicode MS deal with double-width diacritic characters incorrectly, drawing them too far to the left by one character width. According to the Unicode Standard 4.0.0, section 7.7 combining double diacritics go between the two characters to be marked. However, to make text look correct in Arial Unicode MS, the double-width diacritic must be placed after both characters to be marked. This means that it is not possible to make text that renders these characters correctly in both Arial Unicode MS and in other (correctly designed) Unicode fonts. This bug affects the rendering of text written in the International Phonetic Alphabet and in ALA-LC Romanization for non-Latin-script languages. If the displayed font in your browser draws the diacritics correctly, they should appear over the characters: k͠p, k͡p. Furthermore, halves of double-width diacritics are rendered as spacing characters.

The minuscule letters that form the ligatures fi, fl, ffi, ffl, long st, and st are not connected, except for the two f's in the ffi and ffl ligatures. As there is no semantic difference, nothing mandates that these must be connected, and they are indistinguishable from the individual letters placed next to each other.

Arial Unicode MS is unable to render some Arabic characters, particularly those used in Sindhi, in their connected forms, showing only their isolated forms instead.

== Arial Unicode Bold (2011) ==
On December 14, 2011, Monotype Imaging Holdings Inc. announced the release of Arial Unicode Bold, under the name Arial Unicode MS Bold.

== See also ==
- Other well-known fonts with Unicode coverage include:
  - Bitstream Cyberbit
  - TITUS Cyberbit Basic
  - Code2000
  - Doulos SIL
  - Lucida Sans Unicode
- Free software Unicode typefaces
- Unicode fonts
