= CWI-2 =

Digital text encoding

CWI-2 (a.k.a. CWI, cp-hu, HUCWI, or HU8CWI2) is a Hungarian code page frequently used in the 1980s and early 1990s. If this code page is erroneously interpreted as code page 437, it will still be fairly readable (e.g. Á in place of Å).

== Character set ==
The following table shows "CWI-2". Each character is shown with its equivalent Unicode code point. Only the second half is shown, codes less than 128 are identical to code page 437.

CWI-2
	0	1	2	3	4	5	6	7	8	9	A	B	C	D	E	F
8x	Ç	ü	é	â	ä	à	å	ç	ê	ë	è	ï	î	Í	Ä	Á
9x	É	æ	Æ	ő	ö	Ó	ű	Ú	Ű	Ö	Ü	¢	£	¥	₧	ƒ
Ax	á	í	ó	ú	ñ	Ñ	ª	Ő	¿	⌐	¬	½	¼	¡	«	»
Bx	░	▒	▓	│	┤	╡	╢	╖	╕	╣	║	╗	╝	╜	╛	┐
Cx	└	┴	┬	├	─	┼	╞	╟	╚	╔	╩	╦	╠	═	╬	╧
Dx	╨	╤	╥	╙	╘	╒	╓	╫	╪	┘	┌	█	▄	▌	▐	▀
Ex	α	ß	Γ	π	Σ	σ	µ	τ	Φ	Θ	Ω	δ	∞	φ	ε	∩
Fx	≡	±	≥	≤	⌠	⌡	÷	≈	°	∙	·	√	ⁿ	²	■	NBSP

Differences from code page 437

The Unicode encoding used by recode appears to differ in a number of code points:

9F | U+E01F | HUNGARIAN FLORIN (CWI_9F)
E1 | U+03B2 | GREEK SMALL LETTER BETA
E6 | U+03BC | GREEK SMALL LETTER MU
ED | U+2205 | EMPTY SET
F8 | U+2218 | RING OPERATOR
F9 | U+00B7 | MIDDLE DOT
FA | U+2022 | BULLET

Several applications developed in Hungary use almost identical character sets with slight modifications, which include § (U+00A7, SECTION SIGN) at 0x9D and a forint sign (an upper-case F and lower-case t ligated into a single character) at 0x9E or 0xA8. The florin sign was planned to be disunified, but so many encodings have this, it would disrupt many mappings. The forint is usually abbreviated as "Ft"; most Hungarians recognize a lower-case "f" (whether upright or cursive) as meaning fillér, the now-unused subdivision of the forint. Some dot matrix printers of the NEC Pinwriter series, namely the P3200/P3300 (P20/P30), P6200/P6300 (P60/P70), P9300 (P90), P7200/P7300 (P62/P72), P22Q/P32Q, P3800/P3900 (P42Q/P52Q), P1200/P1300 (P2Q/P3Q), P2000 (P2X) and P8000 (P72X), supported the installation of optional font EPROMs. Named "CWI" the optional ROM #7 "Hungaria" included this encoding, invokable via escape sequence ESC R (n) with (n) = 21.

=== CWI-1 ===
The codepage CWI-1 differs only by the position of "Í" (U+00CD, LATIN CAPITAL LETTER I WITH ACUTE) on position 8C instead of 8D and "Ő" (U+0150, LATIN CAPITAL LETTER O WITH DOUBLE ACUTE) on position 8B instead of A7. This codepage is known by Star printers and FreeDOS as Code page 3845 (earlier it was known by FreeDOS as Code page 57781).

== See also ==
- Kamenický encoding
- Mazovia encoding
