= Kamenický encoding =

Character encoding

- Czech text using the Kamenický encoding displayed in CP437
- Alias(es): NEC-867, (Note: Not IBM-867, which is a Hebrew encoding.) DOS-895, (Note: Not IBM-895, which is used on AIX for the Roman set of JIS X 0201.) KEYBCS2
- Languages: Czech, Slovak
- Classification: Extended ASCII, OEM code page
- Based on: OEM-US

The Kamenický encoding (Czech: kódování Kamenických), named for the brothers Jiří and Marian Kamenický, was a code page for personal computers running DOS, very popular in Czechoslovakia (since 1993, the Czech Republic and Slovakia) around 1985–1995. Another name for this encoding is KEYBCS2, the name of the terminate-and-stay-resident utility which implemented the matching keyboard driver. It was also named KAMENICKY.

It was based on the code page 437 encoding (with accented characters for Western-European languages) where most of the characters from code points 128 to 173 were replaced by Czech and Slovak characters chosen so that the glyphs of the replacement characters resembled those of the original as closely as possible, e. g. č in the place of ç. This ensured that text in the Kamenický encoding was (barely) readable even on older or cheap computers with the original fonts (which were often in videocard ROM, making modification difficult if not impossible).

A supplemental feature was that the block graphic and box-drawing characters of code page 437 remained unchanged (IBM's official Central-European code page 852 did not have this property, making programs like Norton Commander look funny with corners and joints of border lines broken by accented letters). The widespread use of the Kamenický encoding was undermined neither by IBM's code page 852, nor by the Windows 3.1 introducing Microsoft Central Europe code page 1250. Only with Windows 95 and the spreading deployment of Microsoft Office did users begin to use code page 1250, which in turn is now obsoleted by Unicode.

Some ambiguity exists in the official code page assignment for the Kamenický encoding:

Some dot matrix printers of the NEC Pinwriter series, namely the P3200/P3300 (P20/P30), P6200/P6300 (P60/P70), P9300 (P90), P7200/P7300 (P62/P72), P22Q/P32Q, P3800/P3900 (P42Q/P52Q), P1200/P1300 (P2Q/P3Q), P2000 (P2X) and P8000 (P72X), supported the installation of optional font EPROMs. The optional ROM #2 "East Europe" included this encoding, invokable via escape sequence ESC R (n) with (n) = 23. While named "Kamenický" in the documentation, it was originally advertised by NEC as code page 867 (CP867) or "Czech". (However, it was never registered with IBM under that ID, as IBM registered another unrelated code page Israel: Hebrew, based on CP862, under that ID in 1998.) The Fujitsu DL6400 (Pro) / DL6600 (Pro) printers support the Kamenický encoding as well.

The encoding was also sometimes called code page 895 (CP895), for example with FoxPro, in the WordPerfect text processor and under the Arachne web browser for DOS, but IBM uses this code page number for a different encoding, CM/Group 2: 7-bit Latin SBCS: Japanese (EUC-JP JIS-Roman) or Japan 7-Bit Latin (00895), and the IANA does not recognize the number at all. The DOS code page switching file NECPINW.CPI for NEC Pinwriters supported the Kamenický encoding under both, code page 867 and 895 as well. This encoding is known as code page 3844 in Star printers.

== Character set ==
Each character is shown with its equivalent Unicode code point. Only the second half of the table (code points 128–255) is shown, the first half (code points 0–127) being the same as code page 437.

Code page 867 / 895
	0	1	2	3	4	5	6	7	8	9	A	B	C	D	E	F
8x	Č 010C	ü 00FC	é 00E9	ď 010F	ä 00E4	Ď 010E	Ť 0164	č 010D	ě 011B	Ě 011A	Ĺ 0139	Í 00CD	ľ 013E	ĺ 013A	Ä 00C4	Á 00C1
9x	É 00C9	ž 017E	Ž 017D	ô 00F4	ö 00F6	Ó 00D3	ů 016F	Ú 00DA	ý 00FD	Ö 00D6	Ü 00DC	Š 0160	Ľ 013D	Ý 00DD	Ř 0158	ť 0165
Ax	á 00E1	í 00ED	ó 00F3	ú 00FA	ň 0148	Ň 0147	Ů 016E	Ô 00D4	š 0161	ř 0159	ŕ 0155	Ŕ 0154	¼ 00BC	§ (Note: The Czech DOS word processor Text602 aka T602 assigned code point 173 to a section sign (U+00A7) in Kamenický encoding. While the original display and printer fonts defined code point 173 as section sign ('§', U+00A7), some tools also used an inverted exclamation mark ('¡', U+00A1) instead, which comes from CP437. This variant is not fully compliant with the definition of code page 867 / 895 and should therefore not be associated with these numbers.); 00A7	« 00AB	» 00BB
Bx	░ 2591	▒ 2592	▓ 2593	│ 2502	┤ 2524	╡ 2561	╢ 2562	╖ 2556	╕ 2555	╣ 2563	║ 2551	╗ 2557	╝ 255D	╜ 255C	╛ 255B	┐ 2510
Cx	└ 2514	┴ 2534	┬ 252C	├ 251C	─ 2500	┼ 253C	╞ 255E	╟ 255F	╚ 255A	╔ 2554	╩ 2569	╦ 2566	╠ 2560	═ 2550	╬ 256C	╧ 2567
Dx	╨ 2568	╤ 2564	╥ 2565	╙ 2559	╘ 2558	╒ 2552	╓ 2553	╫ 256B	╪ 256A	┘ 2518	┌ 250C	█ 2588	▄ 2584	▌ 258C	▐ 2590	▀ 2580
Ex	α 03B1	ß 00DF	Γ 0393	π 03C0	Σ 03A3	σ 03C3	µ 00B5	τ 03C4	Φ 03A6	Θ 0398	Ω 03A9	δ 03B4	∞ 221E	φ 03C6	ε 03B5	∩ 2229
Fx	≡ 2261	± 00B1	≥ 2265	≤ 2264	⌠ 2320	⌡ 2321	÷ 00F7	≈ 2248	° 00B0	∙ 2219	· 00B7	√ 221A	ⁿ 207F	² 00B2	■ 25A0	NBSP

Differences from Code Page 437

== See also ==
- Mazovia encoding – similar code page for Polish
- CWI-2 encoding
- Hardware code page
