= Code page 1058 =

Character encoding specified by IBM

Code page 1058, HP PC-8DN, is a character encoding specified by IBM. It is a close derivation of Code page 865.

== Code page layout ==
Characters are shown with their equivalent Unicode codes.

Code page 1058
	0	1	2	3	4	5	6	7	8	9	A	B	C	D	E	F
0x	NUL	☺	☻	♥	♦	♣	♠	•	◘	○	◙	♂	♀	♪	♫	☼
1x	►	◄	↕	‼	¶	§	▬	↨	↑	↓	→	←	∟	↔	▲	▼
2x	SP	!	"	#	$	%	&	'	(	)	*	+	,	-	.	/
3x	0	1	2	3	4	5	6	7	8	9	:	;	<	=	>	?
4x	@	A	B	C	D	E	F	G	H	I	J	K	L	M	N	O
5x	P	Q	R	S	T	U	V	W	X	Y	Z	[	\	]	ˆ	_
6x	`	a	b	c	d	e	f	g	h	i	j	k	l	m	n	o
7x	p	q	r	s	t	u	v	w	x	y	z	{	│	}	˜	▒
8x	Ç	ü	é	â	ä	à	å	ç	ê	ë	è	ï	î	ì	Ä	Å
9x	É	æ	Æ	ô	ö	ò	û	ù	ÿ	Ö	Ü	ø	£	Ø	Ŀ	ŀ
Ax	á	í	ó	ú	ñ	Ñ	õ	Õ	¿	ã	Ã	ℓ	ŉ	¡	³	¤
Bx	░	▒	▓	│	┤	╡	╢	╖	╕	╣	║	╗	╝	╜	╛	┐
Cx	└	┴	┬	├	─	┼	╞	╟	╚	╔	╩	╦	╠	═	╬	╧
Dx	╨	╤	╥	╙	╘	╒	╓	╫	╪	┘	┌	█	▄	▌	▐	▀
Ex	α	β	Γ	π	Σ	σ	μ	τ	Φ	Θ	Ω	δ	∞	φ	ε	∩
Fx	≡	±	≥	≤	⌠	⌡	÷	≈	˚	∙	·	√	η	²	■	NBSP

Differences from code page 865
