= Code page 863 =

Computer character set for French

- MIME / IANA: IBM863
- Alias(es): cp863, 863

Code page 863 (CCSID 863) (also known as CP 863, IBM 00863, OEM 863, MS-DOS French Canada) is a code page used under DOS in Canada to write French (mainly in Quebec) although it lacks the letters Æ, æ, Œ, œ, Ÿ and ÿ.

== Character set ==
Each character is shown with its equivalent Unicode code point. Only the second half of the table (code points 128–255) is shown, the first half (code points 0–127) being the same as code page 437.

Code page 863
| | 0 | 1 | 2 | 3 | 4 | 5 | 6 | 7 | 8 | 9 | A | B | C | D | E | F |
| 8x | Ç | ü | é | â | Â | à | ¶ | ç | ê | ë | è | ï | î | ‗ | À | § |
| 9x | É | È | Ê | ô | Ë | Ï | û | ù | ¤ | Ô | Ü | ¢ | £ | Ù | Û | ƒ |
| Ax | ¦ | ´ | ó | ú | ¨ | ¸ | ³ | ¯ | Î | ⌐ | ¬ | ½ | ¼ | ¾ | « | » |
| Bx | ░ | ▒ | ▓ | │ | ┤ | ╡ | ╢ | ╖ | ╕ | ╣ | ║ | ╗ | ╝ | ╜ | ╛ | ┐ |
| Cx | └ | ┴ | ┬ | ├ | ─ | ┼ | ╞ | ╟ | ╚ | ╔ | ╩ | ╦ | ╠ | ═ | ╬ | ╧ |
| Dx | ╨ | ╤ | ╥ | ╙ | ╘ | ╒ | ╓ | ╫ | ╪ | ┘ | ┌ | █ | ▄ | ▌ | ▐ | ▀ |
| Ex | α | ß | Γ | π | Σ | σ | µ | τ | Φ | Θ | Ω | δ | ∞ | φ | ε | ∩ |
| Fx | ≡ | ± | ≥ | ≤ | ⌠ | ⌡ | ÷ | ≈ | ° | ∙ | · | √ | ⁿ | ² | ■ | NBSP |

Differences from code page 437
