= 102 =

102 may refer to:

- 102 (number), the natural number following 101 and preceding 103
- AD 102, a year in the 2nd century AD
- 102 BC, a year in the 2nd century BC
- 102 (ambulance service), an emergency medical transport service in Uttar Pradesh, India
- 102 (Clyde) Field Squadron, Royal Engineers
- 102 Miriam, a main-belt asteroid
- 102 River, a stream in Missouri

10/2 may refer to:

- 10//2, a Nike clothing line inspired by Lance Armstrong
- October 2 (month-day date notation)
- February 10 (day-month date notation)
- 10 shillings and 2 pence in UK predecimal currency

== See also ==
- 1/2 (disambiguation), for uses of "1/02"
- Nobelium, chemical element with atomic number 102
