= Code page 867 =

Hebrew character encoding by IBM

IBM-867
- Language: Hebrew
- Classification: Extended ASCII, Bidirectional encoding
- Based on: Code page 862

Code page 867 (CCSID 867) is a Hebrew 8-bit code page defined by IBM in 1998. It is based on Code page 862 but replaces several characters not used in Hebrew with nonprinting characters for bidirectional text support, a euro sign and a shekel sign.

The code page ID is conflictive with a NEC code page for the Kamenický encoding defined since 1992.

== Character set ==
Code page 867
	0	1	2	3	4	5	6	7	8	9	A	B	C	D	E	F
8x	א	ב	ג	ד	ה	ו	ז	ח	ט	י	ך	כ	ל	ם	מ	ן
9x	נ	ס	ע	ף	פ	ץ	צ	ק	ר	ש	ת	¢	£	¥		₪
Ax	LRM	RLM	LRE	RLE	LRO	RLO	PDF			⌐	¬	½	¼	€	«	»
Bx	░	▒	▓	│	┤	╡	╢	╖	╕	╣	║	╗	╝	╜	╛	┐
Cx	└	┴	┬	├	─	┼	╞	╟	╚	╔	╩	╦	╠	═	╬	╧
Dx	╨	╤	╥	╙	╘	╒	╓	╫	╪	┘	┌	█	▄	▌	▐	▀
Ex	α	ß	Γ	π	Σ	σ	μ	τ	Φ	Θ	Ω	δ	∞	φ	ε	∩
Fx	≡	±	≥	≤	⌠	⌡	÷	≈	°	∙	·	√	ⁿ	²	■	NBSP

Differences from code page 862
