= Code page 1098 =

Code page used to write Persian in Iran

Code page 1098 (CCSID 1098) (also known as CP 1098, IBM 01098, is a code page used to write Persian in Iran.

== Character set ==
The following table shows code page 1098. Each character is shown with its equivalent Unicode code point. Only the second half of the table (code points 128–255) is shown, the first half (code points 0–127) being the same as ASCII, except for two code points:

- 25_{hex} which is defined as U+066A ٪ ARABIC PERCENT SIGN instead of U+0025 % PERCENT SIGN
- 2A_{hex} which is defined as U+066D ٭ ARABIC FIVE POINTED STAR instead of U+002A * ASTERISK

Code page 1098
	0	1	2	3	4	5	6	7	8	9	A	B	C	D	E	F
8x			،	؛	؟	ً	ﺁ	ﺂ		ﺍ	ﺎ		ﺀ	ﺃ	ﺄ	
9x	ﺅ	ﺋ	ﺏ	ﺑ	ﭖ	ﭘ	ﺕ	ﺗ	ﺙ	ﺛ	ﺝ	ﺟ	ﭺ	ﭼ	×	ﺡ
Ax	ﺣ	ﺥ	ﺧ	ﺩ	ﺫ	ﺭ	ﺯ	ﮊ	ﺱ	ﺳ	ﺵ	ﺷ	ﺹ	ﺻ	«	»
Bx	░	▒	▓	│	┤	ﺽ	ﺿ	ﻁ	ﻃ	╣	║	╗	╝	﷼^{[a]}	ﻅ	┐
Cx	└	┴	┬	├	─	┼	ﻇ	ﻉ	╚	╔	╩	╦	╠	═	╬	
Dx	ﻊ	ﻋ	ﻌ	ﻍ	ﻎ	ﻏ	ﻐ	ﻑ	ﻓ	┘	┌	█	▄	ﻕ	ﻗ	▀
Ex	ﮎ	ﻛ	ﮒ	ﮔ	ﻝ	ﻟ	ﻡ	ﻣ	ﻥ	ﻧ	ﻭ	ﻩ	ﻫ	ﻬ	ﮤ	ﯼ
Fx	SHY	ﯽ	ﯾ	ـ	۰	۱	۲	۳	۴	۵	۶	۷	۸	۹	■	NBSP

Not in Unicode, mapped to private use area

^a 0xBD represents the currency sign (¤, U+00A4) in the ICU version, which is probably an earlier version.
