= Code page 1115 =

PC DOS character set

Code page 1115 (CCSID 1115), also known as Simplified Chinese PC Data, is a single byte character set (SBCS) used by IBM in its PC DOS operating system in China.

This code page is intended for use with code page 1380 (Simplified Chinese double byte character set). Together, code pages 1115 and 1380 make up 1381.

Code points 0x01 through 0x1F and x7F represent either graphic or control characters depending on the context.

Code points 0x8C through 0xFE are used as lead bytes for double byte characters.

== Code page layout ==
Code page 1115
	0	1	2	3	4	5	6	7	8	9	A	B	C	D	E	F
0x		╔	╗	╚	╝	║	═	↓	◘	○	◙	〿	█	▒	■	☼
1x	╬	▄	↕	‼	▓	╩	╦	╣		╠	░	↵	↑	│	→	←
2x	SP	!	"	#	$	%	&	'	(	)	*	+	,	-	.	/
3x	0	1	2	3	4	5	6	7	8	9	:	;	<	=	>	?
4x	@	A	B	C	D	E	F	G	H	I	J	K	L	M	N	O
5x	P	Q	R	S	T	U	V	W	X	Y	Z	[	\	]		_
6x	`	a	b	c	d	e	f	g	h	i	j	k	l	m	n	o
7x	p	q	r	s	t	u	v	w	x	y	z	{	|	}	~	
8x	£	¬	¥	¯	¦											
