= ABICOMP character set =

Character set used in Brazil

The ABICOMP Character Set was an encoded repertoire of characters used in Brazil. It was devised and named after Associação Brasileira de Indústria de Computadores, a Brazilian computer industry association defunct in 1992. It was adopted by Brazilian-made computers and several printers brands. This code page is known on Star printers and FreeDOS as Code page 3848.

ABICOMP was different from the Brazilian standard BraSCII (very similar to ISO 8859-1). Although once widely used in Brazil, the character lost popularity due to of the ubiquity of other character sets like ISO 8859-1 and later Unicode.

== Coverage ==
The ABICOMP character set primarily contained characters to cover the Portuguese language. It also contained characters for other languages such as Spanish, French, Italian and German. However, the quotation marks "«" and "»" used on European Portuguese, European Spanish, French and Italian are missing.

== Character set ==
ABICOMP
	0	1	2	3	4	5	6	7	8	9	A	B	C	D	E	F
0x																
1x																
2x	SP	!	"	#	$	%	&	'	(	)	*	+	,	-	.	/
3x	0	1	2	3	4	5	6	7	8	9	:	;	<	=	>	?
4x	@	A	B	C	D	E	F	G	H	I	J	K	L	M	N	O
5x	P	Q	R	S	T	U	V	W	X	Y	Z	[	\	]		_
6x	`	a	b	c	d	e	f	g	h	i	j	k	l	m	n	o
7x	p	q	r	s	t	u	v	w	x	y	z	{	|	}	~	
8x																
9x																
Ax	NBSP	À 00C0	Á 00C1	Â 00C2	Ã 00C3	Ä 00C4	Ç 00C7	È 00C8	É 00C9	Ê 00CA	Ë 00CB	Ì 00CC	Í 00CD	Î 00CE	Ï 00CF	Ñ 00D1
Bx	Ò 00D2	Ó 00D3	Ô 00D4	Õ 00D5	Ö 00D6	Œ 0152	Ù 00D9	Ú 00DA	Û 00DB	Ü 00DC	Ÿ 0178	¨ 00A8	£ 00A3	¦ 00A6	§ 00A7	° 00B0
Cx	¡ 00A1	à 00E0	á 00E1	â 00E2	ã 00E3	ä 00E4	ç 00E7	è 00E8	é 00E9	ê 00EA	ë 00EB	ì 00EC	í 00ED	î 00EE	ï 00EF	ñ 00F1
Dx	ò 00F2	ó 00F3	ô 00F4	õ 00F5	ö 00F6	œ 0153	ù 00F9	ú 00FA	û 00FB	ü 00FC	ÿ 00FF	ß 00DF	ª 00AA	º 00BA	¿ 00BF	± 00B1
Ex																
Fx																
