= Code page 1133 =

Character encoding for Lao script

Code page 1133 (CCSID 1133) is a code page created by IBM for representation of Lao script.

== Code page layout ==
Only the upper half of the table (80–FF) is shown, the lower half (00–7F) being the same as ASCII.

Code page 1133
	0	1	2	3	4	5	6	7	8	9	A	B	C	D	E	F
8x																
9x																
Ax		ກ	ຂ	ຄ	ງ	ຈ	ສ	ຊ	ຍ	ດ	ຕ	ຖ	ທ	ນ	ບ	ປ
Bx	ຜ	ຝ	ພ	ຟ	ມ	ຢ	ຣ	ລ	ວ	ຫ	ອ	ຮ				ຯ
Cx	ະ	າ	ຳ	ິ	ີ	ຶ	ື	ຸ	ູ	ຼ	ັ	ົ	ຽ			
Dx	ເ	ແ	ໂ	ໃ	ໄ	່	້	໊	໋	໌	ໍ	ໆ		ໜ	ໝ	₭
Ex																
Fx	໐	໑	໒	໓	໔	໕	໖	໗	໘	໙			¢	¬	¦	NBSP
