= Code page 951 =

Code page 951 is a code page number used for different purposes by IBM and Microsoft.

- IBM uses the code page number 951 for their double-byte PC Data KS code, the double byte component of their code page 949, an encoding for the Korean language. See Code page 949 (IBM).
- The code page number 951 was also used by Microsoft as part of a kludge for providing Hong Kong Supplementary Character Set (HKSCS-2001) support in Windows XP, in the file name of a replacement for code page 950 (Traditional Chinese) with Unicode mappings for some Extended User-defined Characters (EUDC) found in HKSCS. HKSCS characters without a Unicode mapping are assigned a Unicode Private Use Area (PUA) code point following previous practices. The IBM code page number for Big5 with HKSCS-2001 is 5471. See Hong Kong Supplementary Character Set § Microsoft Windows.
