= Code page 1043 =

Computer character set

Code page 1043 (CCSID 1043), also known as Traditional Chinese PC Data Extended, is a single byte character set (SBCS) used by IBM in its PC DOS operating system. This code page is intended for use with code page 927 (Traditional Chinese double byte character set). It is an extension of Code page 904.

== Code page layout ==
Code page 1043
	0	1	2	3	4	5	6	7	8	9	A	B	C	D	E	F
0x		╔	╗	╚	╝	║	═	↓		○		〿			■	☼
1x	╬		↕		▓	╩	╦	╣		╠	░	↵	↑	│	→	←
2x	SP	!	"	#	$	%	&	'	(	)	*	+	,	-	.	/
3x	0	1	2	3	4	5	6	7	8	9	:	;	<	=	>	?
4x	@	A	B	C	D	E	F	G	H	I	J	K	L	M	N	O
5x	P	Q	R	S	T	U	V	W	X	Y	Z	[	\	]		_
6x	`	a	b	c	d	e	f	g	h	i	j	k	l	m	n	o
7x	p	q	r	s	t	u	v	w	x	y	z	{	|	}	~	
8x	¢															
9x																
Ax																
Bx																
Cx																
Dx																
Ex																
Fx														¬	¦	
