= Code page 1118 =

Encoding for the Lithuanian language

- Alias(es): Code page 774
- Language(s): Lithuanian
- Standard: LST 1283
- Based on: Code page 437
- Other related encoding(s): Code page 775 (LST 1590-1); Code page 778 (LST 1590-2); Code page 1119 (LST 1284)

Code page 1118 (also known as CP 1118, IBM 01118, Code page 774, CP 774) is a code page used under DOS to write the Lithuanian language. It was previously standardised in Lithuania as LST 1283.

== Character set ==
The following table shows code page 1118. Each character is shown with its equivalent Unicode code point. Only the second half of the table (code points 128–255) is shown, the first half (code points 0–127) being the same as code page 437.

Code page 774/1118
| | 0 | 1 | 2 | 3 | 4 | 5 | 6 | 7 | 8 | 9 | A | B | C | D | E | F |
| 8x | Ç | ü | é | â | ä | à | å | ç | ê | ë | è | ï | î | ì | Ä | Å |
| 9x | É | æ | Æ | ô | ö | ò | û | ù | ÿ | Ö | Ü | ¢ | £ | ¥ | ₧ | ƒ |
| Ax | á | í | ó | ú | ñ | Ñ | ª | º | ¿ | ⌐ | ¬ | ½ | ¼ | ¡ | « | » |
| Bx | ░ | ▒ | ▓ | │ | ┤ | Ą | Č | Ę | Ė | ╣ | ║ | ╗ | ╝ | Į | Š | ┐ |
| Cx | └ | ┴ | ┬ | ├ | ─ | ┼ | Ų | Ū | ╚ | ╔ | ╩ | ╦ | ╠ | ═ | ╬ | Ž |
| Dx | ą | č | ę | ė | į | š | ų | ū | ž | ┘ | ┌ | █ | ▄ | ▌ | ▐ | ▀ |
| Ex | α | ß | Γ | π | Σ | σ | µ | τ | Φ | Θ | Ω | δ | ∞ | φ | ε | ∩ |
| Fx | ≡ | ± | ≥ | ≤ | „ | “ | ÷ | ≈ | ° | ∙ | · | √ | ⁿ | ² | ■ | NBSP |

Differences from code page 437
