= Code page 737 =

VGA text mode code page

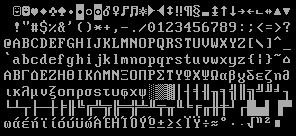
- Code page 737 character grid
- Alias(es): MS-DOS Greek
- Languages: Greek, English
- Extends: US-ASCII

Code page 737 (CCSID 737) (also known as CP 737, IBM 00737, and OEM 737, MS-DOS Greek or 437 G) is a code page used under DOS to write the Greek language. It was much more popular than code page 869 although it lacks the letters ΐ and ΰ.

== Character set ==
The following table shows code page 737. Each character is shown with its equivalent Unicode code point. Only the second half of the table (code points 128–255) is shown, the first half (code points 0–127) being the same as code page 437.

Code page 737
| | 0 | 1 | 2 | 3 | 4 | 5 | 6 | 7 | 8 | 9 | A | B | C | D | E | F |
|---|---|---|---|---|---|---|---|---|---|---|---|---|---|---|---|---|
| 8x | Α | Β | Γ | Δ | Ε | Ζ | Η | Θ | Ι | Κ | Λ | Μ | Ν | Ξ | Ο | Π |
| 9x | Ρ | Σ | Τ | Υ | Φ | Χ | Ψ | Ω | α | β | γ | δ | ε | ζ | η | θ |
| Ax | ι | κ | λ | μ | ν | ξ | ο | π | ρ | σ | ς | τ | υ | φ | χ | ψ |
| Bx | ░ | ▒ | ▓ | │ | ┤ | ╡ | ╢ | ╖ | ╕ | ╣ | ║ | ╗ | ╝ | ╜ | ╛ | ┐ |
| Cx | └ | ┴ | ┬ | ├ | ─ | ┼ | ╞ | ╟ | ╚ | ╔ | ╩ | ╦ | ╠ | ═ | ╬ | ╧ |
| Dx | ╨ | ╤ | ╥ | ╙ | ╘ | ╒ | ╓ | ╫ | ╪ | ┘ | ┌ | █ | ▄ | ▌ | ▐ | ▀ |
| Ex | ω | ά | έ | ή | ϊ | ί | ό | ύ | ϋ | ώ | Ά | Έ | Ή | Ί | Ό | Ύ |
| Fx | Ώ | ± | ≥ | ≤ | Ϊ | Ϋ | ÷ | ≈ | ° | ∙ | · | √ | ⁿ | ² | ■ | NBSP |

Some earlier OEM implementations and some software does not support these characters.

== Code page 210 ==
Code page 210 is similar, but it does not have the capital letters Ϊ and Ϋ and instead has the symbols ⌠ and ⌡ at these spots, like Code page 437 does.
