= Code page 1040 =

Character encoding used in PC DOS

Code page 1040 (CCSID 1040), also known as Korean PC Data Extended, is a single byte character set (SBCS) used by IBM in its PC DOS operating system for Hangul. It is an extended version of the 8-bit form of the N-byte Hangul Code first specified by the 1974 edition of KS C 5601 (compare the relationship between Code page 1041 and JIS X 0201 for katakana).

== Code page layout ==
Code page 1040
| | 0 | 1 | 2 | 3 | 4 | 5 | 6 | 7 | 8 | 9 | A | B | C | D | E | F |
|---|---|---|---|---|---|---|---|---|---|---|---|---|---|---|---|---|
| 0x | | ╔ | ╗ | ╚ | ╝ | ║ | ═ | ↓ | | ○ | | 〿 | | | ■ | ☼ |
| 1x | ╬ | | ↕ | | ▓ | ╩ | ╦ | ╣ | | ╠ | ░ | ↵ | ↑ | │ | → | ← |
| 2x | SP | ! | " | # | $ | % | & | ' | ( | ) | * | + | , | - | . | / |
| 3x | 0 | 1 | 2 | 3 | 4 | 5 | 6 | 7 | 8 | 9 | : | ; | < | = | > | ? |
| 4x | @ | A | B | C | D | E | F | G | H | I | J | K | L | M | N | O |
| 5x | P | Q | R | S | T | U | V | W | X | Y | Z | [ | ₩ | ] | | _ |
| 6x | ` | a | b | c | d | e | f | g | h | i | j | k | l | m | n | o |
| 7x | p | q | r | s | t | u | v | w | x | y | z | { | | | } | ¯ | |
| 8x | ¢ | | | | | | | | | | | | | | | |
| 9x | | | | | | | | | | | | | | | | |
| Ax | | | | | | | | | | | | | | | | |
| Bx | | | | | | | | | | | | | | | | |
| Cx | HWHF | ﾡ | ﾢ | ﾣ | ﾤ | ﾥ | ﾦ | ﾧ | ﾨ | ﾩ | ﾪ | ﾫ | ﾬ | ﾭ | ﾮ | ﾯ |
| Dx | ﾰ | ﾱ | ﾲ | ﾳ | ﾴ | ﾵ | ﾶ | ﾷ | ﾸ | ﾹ | ﾺ | ﾻ | ﾼ | ﾽ | ﾾ | ¦ |
| Ex | | | ￂ | ￃ | ￄ | ￅ | ￆ | ￇ | | | ￊ | ￋ | ￌ | ￍ | ￎ | ￏ |
| Fx | | | ￒ | ￓ | ￔ | ￕ | ￖ | ￗ | | | ￚ | ￛ | ￜ | ¬ | \ | ~ |

Letter Number Punctuation Symbol Other Undefined
