= Code page 1117 =

Computer character set for Baltic languages

Code page 1117 (also known as CP 1117, IBM 01117) is a code page used under DOS to write the Estonian, Lithuanian and Latvian languages. It is closely related to both code page 773 and code page 775. This is also known as Latvian standard LVS 8-2.

== Character set ==
The following table shows code page 1117. Each character is shown with its equivalent Unicode code point. Only the second half of the table (code points 128–255) is shown, the first half (code points 0–127) being the same as code page 437.

Code page 1117
	0	1	2	3	4	5	6	7	8	9	A	B	C	D	E	F
8x	Ć	ü	é	ā	ä	ģ	å	ć	ł	ē	ė	į	ī	Ź	Ä	Å
9x	É	Ż	ż	ō	ö	Ģ	ū	Ś	ś	Ö	Ü	ń	Ļ	Ł	×	č
Ax	Ā	Ī	ó	ų	Ą	ą	Ž	ž	Ę	ę	Ė	ź	Č	Į	«	»
Bx	░	▒	▓	│	┤	╡	╢	╖	╕	╣	║	╗	╝	╜	╛	┐
Cx	└	┴	┬	├	─	┼	╞	╟	╚	╔	╩	╦	╠	═	╬	╧
Dx	╨	╤	╥	╙	╘	╒	╓	╫	╪	┘	┌	█	▄	▌	▐	▀
Ex	Ó	ß	Ō	Ń	õ	Õ	Š	š	Ķ	ķ	Ū	Ų	ļ	Ē	Ņ	ņ
Fx	SHY	±	æ	Æ	¶	¤	÷	ø	°	Ø	·	ŗ	Ŗ	„	“	NBSP
