= Code page 1116 =

DOS code page to write Estonian language

Code page 1116 (also known as CP 1116 or IBM 01116) is a code page used under DOS to write the Estonian language. It is a modification of code page 850.

== Character set ==
The following table shows code page 1116. Each character appears with its equivalent Unicode code-point. Only the second half of the table (code points 128–255) is shown, the first half (code points 0–127) being the same as code page 850.

Code page 1116
	0	1	2	3	4	5	6	7	8	9	A	B	C	D	E	F
8x	Ç	ü	é	â	ä	à	å	ç	ê	ë	è	ï	î	ì	Ä	Å
9x	É	æ	Æ	ô	ö	ò	û	ù	ÿ	Ö	Ü	ø	£	Ø	×	ƒ
Ax	á	í	ó	ú	ñ	Ñ	ª	º	¿	®	¬	½	¼	¡	«	»
Bx	░	▒	▓	│	┤	Á	Â	À	©	╣	║	╗	╝	¢	¥	┐
Cx	└	┴	┬	├	─	┼	ã	Ã	╚	╔	╩	╦	╠	═	╬	¤
Dx	š	Š	Ê	Ë	È	ı	Í	Î	Ï	┘	┌	█	▄	¦	Ì	▀
Ex	Ó	ß	Ô	Ò	õ	Õ	µ	ž	Ž	Ú	Û	Ù	ý	Ý	¯	´
Fx	SHY	±	‗	¾	¶	§	÷	¸	°	¨	·	¹	³	²	■	NBSP

Differences from code page 850
