= Mac OS Turkish encoding =

Character encoding on Macintosh computers

Mac OS Turkish
- Alias(es): x-mac-turkish, Code page 10081
- Language: Turkish
- Created by: Apple, Inc.
- Classification: Extended ASCII, Mac OS script
- Extends: US-ASCII
- Based on: Mac OS Roman

Mac OS Turkish is a character encoding used on Apple Macintosh computers to represent the Turkish language. It is a derivative of Mac OS Roman.

IBM uses code page 1281 (CCSID 1281), while Microsoft uses code page 10081.

== Character set ==
Each character is shown with its equivalent Unicode code point. Only the second half of the table (code points 128–255) is shown, the first half (code points 0–127) being the same as ASCII.

MacTurkish
	0	1	2	3	4	5	6	7	8	9	A	B	C	D	E	F
8x	Ä	Å	Ç	É	Ñ	Ö	Ü	á	à	â	ä	ã	å	ç	é	è
9x	ê	ë	í	ì	î	ï	ñ	ó	ò	ô	ö	õ	ú	ù	û	ü
Ax	†	°	¢	£	§	•	¶	ß	®	©	™	´	¨	≠	Æ	Ø
Bx	∞	±	≤	≥	¥	μ	∂	Σ	∏	π	∫	ª	º	Ω	æ	ø
Cx	¿	¡	¬	√	ƒ	≈	∆	«	»	…	NBSP	À	Ã	Õ	Œ	œ
Dx	–	—	“	”	‘	’	÷	◊	ÿ	Ÿ	Ğ	ğ	İ	ı	Ş	ş
Ex	‡	·	‚	„	‰	Â	Ê	Á	Ë	È	Í	Î	Ï	Ì	Ó	Ô
Fx	^{*}	Ò	Ú	Û	Ù		ˆ	˜	¯	˘	˙	˚	¸	˝	˛	ˇ

Differences from MacRoman
- ^* The character 0xF0 is a solid Apple logo. Apple uses U+F8FF in the Corporate Private Use Area for this logo, but it is usually not supported on non-Apple platforms.
