= Code page 862 =

Digital text encoding

- MIME / IANA: IBM862
- Alias(es): cp862, 862, csPC862LatinHebrew

Code page 862 (CCSID 862) (also known as CP 862, IBM 00862, OEM 862 (Hebrew), MS-DOS Hebrew) is a code page used under DOS in Israel for Hebrew.

Like ISO 8859-8, it encodes only letters, not vowel-points or cantillation marks. As DOS had no inherent bidirectionality support, Hebrew text encoded using code page 862 was usually stored in visual order; nevertheless, a few DOS applications, notably a word processor named EinsteinWriter, stored Hebrew in logical order.

Code page 862 was replaced by Windows-1255 in Windows 3.x and 9x systems, and later by Unicode in Windows NT onwards. It is now obsolete.

== Character set ==
The following table shows code page 862. It has the Hebrew letters in code positions 128–154 (80–9A_{hex}), but otherwise it is identical to code page 437. Each character is shown with its equivalent Unicode code point. Only the second half of the table (code points 128–255) is shown, the first half (code points 0–127) being the same as code page 437.

Code page 862
	0	1	2	3	4	5	6	7	8	9	A	B	C	D	E	F
8x	א	ב	ג	ד	ה	ו	ז	ח	ט	י	ך	כ	ל	ם	מ	ן
9x	נ	ס	ע	ף	פ	ץ	צ	ק	ר	ש	ת	¢	£	¥	₧	ƒ
Ax	á	í	ó	ú	ñ	Ñ	ª	º	¿	⌐	¬	½	¼	¡	«	»
Bx	░	▒	▓	│	┤	╡	╢	╖	╕	╣	║	╗	╝	╜	╛	┐
Cx	└	┴	┬	├	─	┼	╞	╟	╚	╔	╩	╦	╠	═	╬	╧
Dx	╨	╤	╥	╙	╘	╒	╓	╫	╪	┘	┌	█	▄	▌	▐	▀
Ex	α	ß	Γ	π	Σ	σ	µ	τ	Φ	Θ	Ω	δ	∞	φ	ε	∩
Fx	≡	±	≥	≤	⌠	⌡	÷	≈	°	∙	·	√	ⁿ	²	■	NBSP

Differences from code page 437

== See also ==
- 7-bit Hebrew under ISO 646
- Hebrew MS-DOS (HDOS)
