= Mac OS Croatian encoding =

Character encoding on Macintosh computers

Mac OS Croatian
- Alias(es): x-mac-croatian, Code page 10082
- Languages: Croatian, Bosnian, Serbian (Latin script), Slovene, Albanian
- Created by: Apple, Inc.
- Classification: Extended ASCII, Mac OS script
- Extends: US-ASCII
- Based on: Mac OS Roman, ISO 8859-2

Mac OS Croatian is a character encoding used on Apple Macintosh computers to represent Gaj's Latin alphabet. It is a derivative of Mac OS Roman. The three digraphs, ǅ, ǈ, and ǋ, are not encoded.

IBM uses code page 1284 (CCSID 1284) for Mac OS Croatian, while Microsoft uses code page 10082.

The Croatian letters are added at the same positions as in ISO 8859-2. Despite having several added letters in common with Mac OS Central European, these are not encoded in the same positions.

== Layout ==
Each character is shown with its equivalent Unicode code point and its decimal code point. Only the second half of the table (code points 128–255) is shown, the first half (code points 0–127) being the same as ASCII.

Mac OS Croatian
	0	1	2	3	4	5	6	7	8	9	A	B	C	D	E	F
8x	Ä	Å	Ç	É	Ñ	Ö	Ü	á	à	â	ä	ã	å	ç	é	è
9x	ê	ë	í	ì	î	ï	ñ	ó	ò	ô	ö	õ	ú	ù	û	ü
Ax	†	°	¢	£	§	•	¶	ß	®	Š	™	´	¨	≠	Ž	Ø
Bx	∞	±	≤	≥	∆	µ	∂	∑	Π	š	∫	ª	º	Ω	ž	ø
Cx	¿	¡	¬	√	ƒ	≈	Ć	«	Č	…	NBSP	À	Ã	Õ	Œ	œ
Dx	Đ	—	“	”	‘	’	÷	◊	(Note: The character at 0xD8 is a solid Apple logo. Apple uses U+F8FF in the Corporate Private Use Area for this logo, but it is usually not supported on non-Apple platforms.)	©	/	€ (Note: Before Mac OS 8.5, the character 0xDB mapped to currency sign (¤), Unicode character U+00A4.)	‹	›	Æ	»
Ex	–	·	‚	„	‰	Â	ć	Á	č	È	Í	Î	Ï	Ì	Ó	Ô
Fx	đ	Ò	Ú	Û	Ù	ı	ˆ	˜	¯	π	Ë	˚	¸	Ê	æ	ˇ

Differences from MacRoman
