= Mac OS Greek encoding =

Character encoding on Macintosh computers

Mac OS Greek encoding (also known as MacGreek encoding or Macintosh Greek encoding) is used in Apple Macintosh computers to represent texts in the Greek language that uses the Greek script. This encoding is registered as IBM code page/CCSID 1280 and Windows code page 10006.

== Code page layout ==
The following table shows the MacGreek encoding. Each character is shown with its equivalent Unicode code point. Only the second half of the table (code points 128–255) is shown, the first half (code points 0–127) being the same as ASCII.

MacGreek encoding
	0	1	2	3	4	5	6	7	8	9	A	B	C	D	E	F
8x	Ä	¹	²	É	³	Ö	Ü	΅	à	â	ä	΄	¨	ç	é	è
9x	ê	ë	£	™	î	ï	•	½	‰	ô	ö	¦	€ (Note: Before Mac OS 9.2.2, the character 0x9C mapped to SHY, Unicode character U+00AD. the character 0xFF was empty.)	ù	û	ü
Ax	†	Γ	Δ	Θ	Λ	Ξ	Π	ß	®	©	Σ	Ϊ	§	≠	°	·
Bx	Α	±	≤	≥	¥	Β	Ε	Ζ	Η	Ι	Κ	Μ	Φ	Ϋ	Ψ	Ω
Cx	ά	Ν	¬	Ο	Ρ	≈	Τ	«	»	…	NBSP	Υ	Χ	Ά	Έ	œ
Dx	–	―	“	”	‘	’	÷	Ή	Ί	Ό	Ύ	έ	ή	ί	ό	Ώ
Ex	ύ	α	β	ψ	δ	ε	φ	γ	η	ι	ξ	κ	λ	μ	ν	ο
Fx	π	ώ	ρ	σ	τ	θ	ω	ς	χ	υ	ζ	ϊ	ϋ	ΐ	ΰ	SHY
