= Mac OS Romanian encoding =

Character encoding on Macintosh computers

Mac OS Romanian
- Alias(es): x-mac-romanian, Code page 10010
- Language: Romanian
- Created by: Apple, Inc.
- Classification: Extended ASCII, Mac OS script
- Extends: US-ASCII
- Based on: Mac OS Roman

Mac OS Romanian is a character encoding used on Apple Macintosh computers to represent the Romanian language. It is a derivative of Mac OS Roman.

IBM uses code page 1285 (CCSID 1285) for Mac OS Romanian.

== Character set ==
Each character is shown with its equivalent Unicode code point. Only the second half of the table (code points 128–255) is shown, the first half (code points 0–127) being the same as ASCII.

Mac OS Romanian
	0	1	2	3	4	5	6	7	8	9	A	B	C	D	E	F
8x	Ä	Å	Ç	É	Ñ	Ö	Ü	á	à	â	ä	ã	å	ç	é	è
9x	ê	ë	í	ì	î	ï	ñ	ó	ò	ô	ö	õ	ú	ù	û	ü
Ax	†	°	¢	£	§	•	¶	ß	®	©	™	´	¨	≠	Ă	Ș
Bx	∞	±	≤	≥	¥	μ	∂	∑	Π	π	∫	ª	º	Ω	ă	ș
Cx	¿	¡	¬	√	ƒ	≈	∆	«	»	…	NBSP	À	Ã	Õ	Œ	œ
Dx	–	—	“	”	‘	’	÷	◊	ÿ	Ÿ	/	€ (Note: Before Mac OS 8.5, the character 0xDB mapped to currency sign (¤), Unicode character U+00A4.)	‹	›	Ț	ț
Ex	‡	·	‚	„	‰	Â	Ê	Á	Ë	È	Í	Î	Ï	Ì	Ó	Ô
Fx	(Note: The character 0xF0 is a solid Apple logo. Apple uses U+F8FF in the Corporate Private Use Area for this logo, but it is usually not supported on non-Apple platforms.)	Ò	Ú	Û	Ù	ı	ˆ	˜	¯	˘	˙	˚	¸	˝	˛	ˇ

Differences from MacRoman
