= Code page 869 =

DOS Code page

- MIME / IANA: IBM869
- Alias(es): cp869, 869, cp-gr

Code page 869 (CCSID 869) (CP 869, IBM 869, OEM 869) is a code page used under DOS to write Greek and may also be used to get Greek letters for other uses such as math. It is also called DOS Greek 2. It was designed to include all characters from ISO 8859-7.

Code page 869 was not as popular as code page 737.

CCSID 9061 added the euro symbol at code point 87_{hex}.

== Character set ==
The following table shows code page 869. Each character is shown with its equivalent Unicode code point. Only the second half of the table (code points 128–255) is shown, the first half (code points 0–127) being the same as code page 437.

Code page 869
	0	1	2	3	4	5	6	7	8	9	A	B	C	D	E	F
8x							Ά	€	·	¬	¦	‘	’	Έ	―	Ή
9x	Ί	Ϊ	Ό			Ύ	Ϋ	©	Ώ	²	³	ά	£	έ	ή	ί
Ax	ϊ	ΐ	ό	ύ	Α	Β	Γ	Δ	Ε	Ζ	Η	½	Θ	Ι	«	»
Bx	░	▒	▓	│	┤	Κ	Λ	Μ	Ν	╣	║	╗	╝	Ξ	Ο	┐
Cx	└	┴	┬	├	─	┼	Π	Ρ	╚	╔	╩	╦	╠	═	╬	Σ
Dx	Τ	Υ	Φ	Χ	Ψ	Ω	α	β	γ	┘	┌	█	▄	δ	ε	▀
Ex	ζ	η	θ	ι	κ	λ	μ	ν	ξ	ο	π	ρ	σ	ς	τ	΄
Fx	SHY	±	υ	φ	χ	§	ψ	΅	°	¨	ω	ϋ	ΰ	ώ	■	NBSP
