= Code page 865 =

Computer character set for Nordic languages

- MIME / IANA: IBM865
- Alias(es): cp865, 865

Code page 865 (CCSID 865) (also known as CP 865, IBM 00865, OEM 865, DOS Nordic) is a code page used under DOS in Denmark and Norway to write Nordic languages (except Icelandic, for which code page 861 is used).

Code page 865 differs from code page 437 in three points: 0x9B (ø instead of ¢), 0x9D (Ø instead of ¥) and 0xAF (¤ instead of »). The letter Ø is required for the Danish and Norwegian languages.

In the BBS software MBBS and its descendant BBBS, code page 865 was referred to as IBN (by contrast with IBM, which was used for code page 437).

== Character set ==
The following table shows code page 865. Each character is shown with its equivalent Unicode code point. Only the second half of the table (code points 128–255) is shown, the first half (code points 0–127) being the same as code page 437.

Code page 865
	0	1	2	3	4	5	6	7	8	9	A	B	C	D	E	F
8x	Ç	ü	é	â	ä	à	å	ç	ê	ë	è	ï	î	ì	Ä	Å
9x	É	æ	Æ	ô	ö	ò	û	ù	ÿ	Ö	Ü	ø	£	Ø	₧	ƒ
Ax	á	í	ó	ú	ñ	Ñ	ª	º	¿	⌐	¬	½	¼	¡	«	¤
Bx	░	▒	▓	│	┤	╡	╢	╖	╕	╣	║	╗	╝	╜	╛	┐
Cx	└	┴	┬	├	─	┼	╞	╟	╚	╔	╩	╦	╠	═	╬	╧
Dx	╨	╤	╥	╙	╘	╒	╓	╫	╪	┘	┌	█	▄	▌	▐	▀
Ex	α	ß	Γ	π	Σ	σ	μ	τ	Φ	Θ	Ω	δ	∞	φ	ε	∩
Fx	≡	±	≥	≤	⌠	⌡	÷	≈	°	∙	·	√	ⁿ	²	■	NBSP

Differences from code page 437
