= Code page 861 =

Computer character set for Icelandic

- MIME / IANA: IBM861
- Alias(es): cp861, 861, cp-is

Code page 861 (CCSID 861) (also known as CP 861, IBM 00861, OEM 861, DOS Icelandic) is a code page used under DOS in Iceland to write the Icelandic language (as well as other Nordic languages).

== Character set ==
The following table shows code page 861. Each character is shown with its equivalent Unicode code point. Only the second half of the table (code points 128–255) is shown, the first half (code points 0–127) being the same as code page 437.

Code page 861
	0	1	2	3	4	5	6	7	8	9	A	B	C	D	E	F
8x	Ç	ü	é	â	ä	à	å	ç	ê	ë	è	Ð	ð	Þ	Ä	Å
9x	É	æ	Æ	ô	ö	þ	û	Ý	ý	Ö	Ü	ø	£	Ø	₧	ƒ
Ax	á	í	ó	ú	Á	Í	Ó	Ú	¿	⌐	¬	½	¼	¡	«	»
Bx	░	▒	▓	│	┤	╡	╢	╖	╕	╣	║	╗	╝	╜	╛	┐
Cx	└	┴	┬	├	─	┼	╞	╟	╚	╔	╩	╦	╠	═	╬	╧
Dx	╨	╤	╥	╙	╘	╒	╓	╫	╪	┘	┌	█	▄	▌	▐	▀
Ex	α	ß	Γ	π	Σ	σ	µ	τ	Φ	Θ	Ω	δ	∞	φ	ε	∩
Fx	≡	±	≥	≤	⌠	⌡	÷	≈	°	∙	·	√	ⁿ	²	■	NBSP

Differences from code page 437
