= 1/2 =

1/2 may refer to:

- One half (½ or 1/2)
- January 2 (month-day date notation)
- 1 February (day-month date notation)
- 1st Battalion 2nd Marines
- 1 shilling and 2 pence in British predecimal currency
