= \/ =

\/ may refer to:

- an escaped slash character
- \/, ASCII symbol for the boolean "or" operator, formed with a backslash and a slash
  - The ALGOL 68 boolean "or" operator
  - \/, the boolean "or" operator in early K&R C in Unix V6, Unix V7 and more recently BSD 2.11
- the letter "V"
