= Block Elements =

- Range: U+2580..U+259F (32 code points)
- Plane: BMP
- Scripts: Common
- Symbol sets: Block fills
- Assigned: 32 code points
- Unused: 0 reserved code points

Unicode version history
- 1.0.0 (1991): 22 (+22)
- 3.2 (2002): 32 (+10)

Unicode documentation
- Code chart ∣ Web page

Block Elements is a Unicode block containing square block symbols of various fill and shading. Used along with block elements are box-drawing characters, shade characters, and terminal graphic characters. These can be used for filling regions of the screen and portraying drop shadows. Its block name in Unicode 1.0 was Blocks.

== Character table ==
Code	Result	Description
U+2580	▀	Upper half block
U+2581	▁	Lower one eighth block
U+2582	▂	Lower one quarter block
U+2583	▃	Lower three eighths block
U+2584	▄	Lower half block
U+2585	▅	Lower five eighths block
U+2586	▆	Lower three quarters block
U+2587	▇	Lower seven eighths block
U+2588	█	Full block
U+2589	▉	Left seven eighths block
U+258A	▊	Left three quarters block
U+258B	▋	Left five eighths block
U+258C	▌	Left half block
U+258D	▍	Left three eighths block
U+258E	▎	Left one quarter block
U+258F	▏	Left one eighth block
U+2590	▐	Right half block
U+2591	░	Light shade
U+2592	▒	Medium shade
U+2593	▓	Dark shade
U+2594	▔	Upper one eighth block
U+2595	▕	Right one eighth block
U+2596	▖	Quadrant lower left
U+2597	▗	Quadrant lower right
U+2598	▘	Quadrant upper left
U+2599	▙	Quadrant upper left and lower left and lower right
U+259A	▚	Quadrant upper left and lower right
U+259B	▛	Quadrant upper left and upper right and lower left
U+259C	▜	Quadrant upper left and upper right and lower right
U+259D	▝	Quadrant upper right
U+259E	▞	Quadrant upper right and lower left
U+259F	▟	Quadrant upper right and lower left and lower right

== Font coverage ==
Font sets like Code2000 and the DejaVu family include coverage for each of the glyphs in the Block Elements range. Unifont also contains all the glyphs. Among the fonts in widespread use, full implementation is provided by Segoe UI Symbol.

The glyphs in Block Elements each share the same character width in most supported fonts, allowing them to be used graphically in row and column arrangements. However, the block does not contain a space character of its own and ASCII space may or may not render at the same width as Block Elements glyphs, as those characters are intended to be used exclusively for monospaced fonts.

== Compact table ==
Block Elements^{[1]} Official Unicode Consortium code chart (PDF)
	0	1	2	3	4	5	6	7	8	9	A	B	C	D	E	F
U+258x	▀	▁	▂	▃	▄	▅	▆	▇	█	▉	▊	▋	▌	▍	▎	▏
U+259x	▐	░	▒	▓	▔	▕	▖	▗	▘	▙	▚	▛	▜	▝	▞	▟
Notes: 1. As of Unicode version 17.0

== History ==
The following Unicode-related documents record the purpose and process of defining specific characters in the Block Elements block:

Version	Final code points (Note: Proposed code points and characters names may differ from final code points and names)	Count	L2 ID	WG2 ID	Document
1.0.0	U+2580..2595	22			(to be determined)
3.2	U+2596..259F	10	L2/00-159		da Cruz, Frank (2000-03-31), Supplemental Terminal Graphics for Unicode
3.2	U+2596..259F	10	L2/00-115R2		Moore, Lisa (2000-08-08), "Motion 83-M24", Minutes Of UTC Meeting #83
3.2	U+2596..259F	10	L2/00-329	N2265	Whistler, Ken (2000-09-19), Proposal for Terminal Graphic Symbols in the BMP
3.2	U+2596..259F	10	L2/01-050	N2253	Umamaheswaran, V. S. (2001-01-21), "Resolution M39.20 (Terminal Graphic Symbols)", Minutes of the SC2/WG2 meeting in Athens, September 2000

== Related symbols ==
- U+220E ∎ END OF PROOF in the Mathematical Operators Unicode block.
- U+25A0 ■ BLACK SQUARE in the Geometric Shapes Unicode block.

== See also ==
- Box-drawing characters
- Code page 437, the character set of the original IBM PC
- Dingbat
- Semigraphics (or pseudographics)
- Tombstone (typography)
- other Unicode blocks
  - Box Drawing
  - Geometric Shapes
  - Halfwidth and Fullwidth Forms
  - Symbols for Legacy Computing
