= PETSCII =

Character encoding on Commodore computers

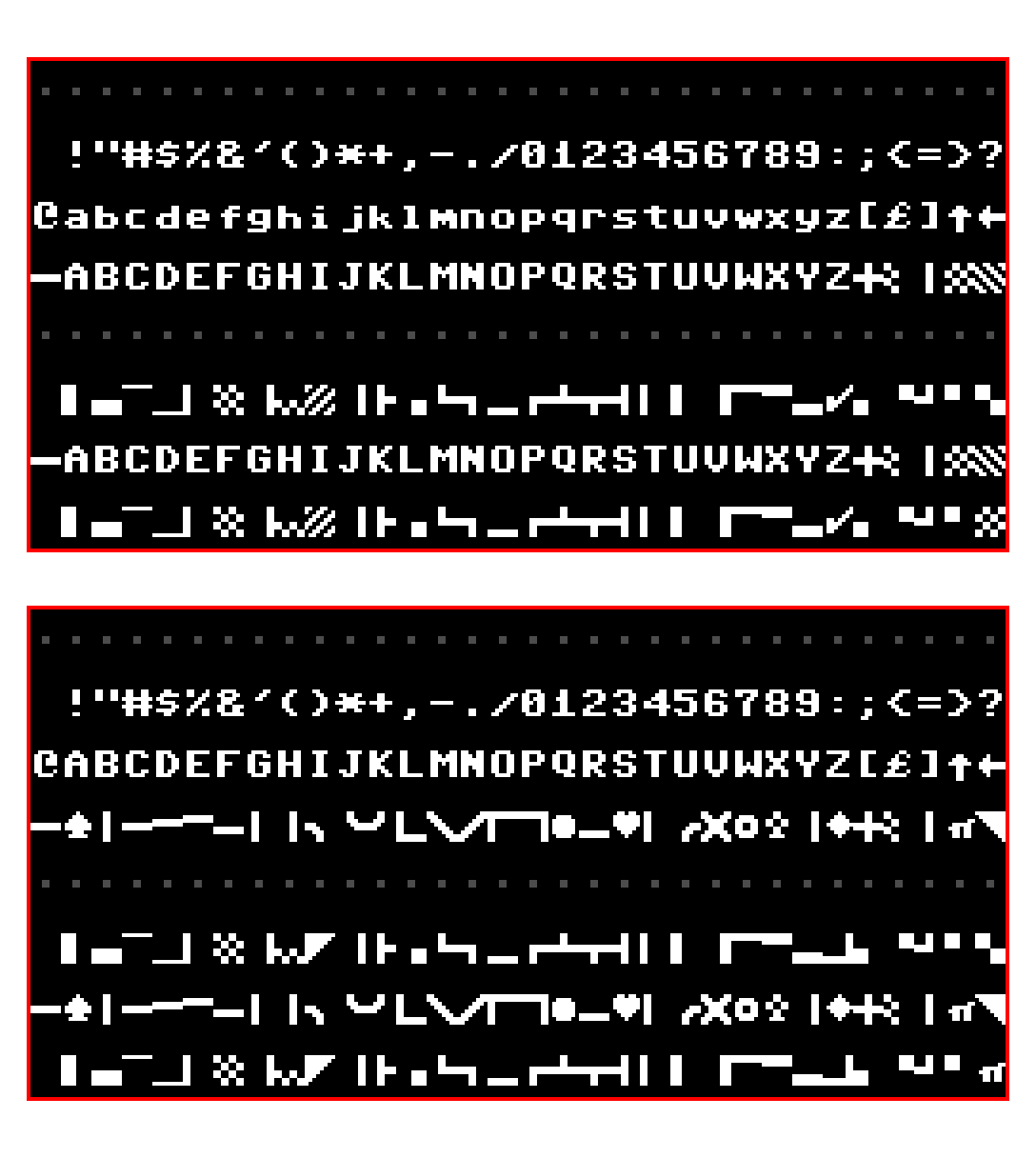
- PETSCII (shifted and unshifted)
- Language: English with pseudographics
- Classification: 8-bit extended early ASCII
- Based on: US-ASCII (1963 version)

PETSCII (PET Standard Code of Information Interchange), also known as CBM ASCII, is the character set used in Commodore Business Machines' 8-bit home computers.

This character set was first used by the PET from 1977, and was subsequently used by the CBM-II, VIC-20, Commodore 64, Commodore 16, Commodore 116, Plus/4, and Commodore 128. However, the Amiga personal computer family instead uses standard ISO/IEC 8859-1.

== History ==
The character set was largely designed by Leonard Tramiel (the son of Commodore CEO Jack Tramiel) and PET designer Chuck Peddle. The graphic characters of PETSCII were one of the extensions Commodore specified for Commodore BASIC when laying out desired changes to Microsoft's existing 6502 BASIC to Microsoft's Ric Weiland in 1977. The VIC-20 used the same pixel-for-pixel font as the PET, although the characters appeared wider due to the VIC's 22-column screen. The Commodore 64, however, used a slightly re-designed, heavy upper-case font, essentially a thicker version of the PET's, in order to avoid color artifacts created by the machine's higher resolution screen. The C64's lowercase characters are identical to the lowercase characters in the Atari 8-bit computers ATASCII font (released 2.75 years earlier).

Peddle claims the inclusion of card suit symbols was spurred by the demand that it should be easy to write card games on the PET (as part of the specification list he received).

== Specifications ==
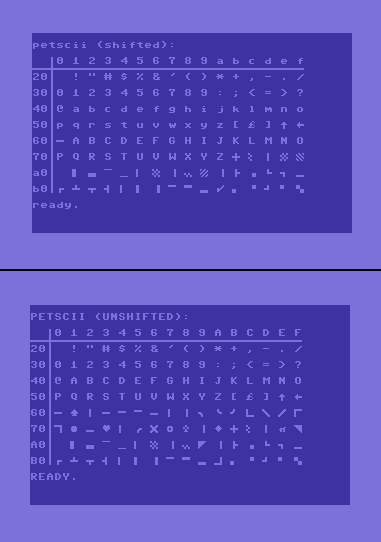
PETSCII Chart as displayed on the Commodore 64 in shifted and unshifted modes. (Not shown are control codes, as well as characters in the 0xC0–0xFF range, which are the standard uppercase keycodes returned from the keyboard, and which are duplicated to the range 0x60–0x7F.)

"Unshifted" PETSCII is based on the 1963 version of ASCII (rather than the 1967 version, which most if not all other computer character sets based on ASCII use). It has only uppercase letters, an up-arrow ⟨↑⟩ instead of caret ⟨^⟩ at 0x5E and a left-arrow ⟨←⟩ instead of an underscore ⟨_⟩ at 0x5F. In all versions except the original Commodore PET, it also has a British pound sign ⟨£⟩ instead of the backslash ⟨\⟩ at 0x5C. Other characters added in ASCII-1967 (lowercase letters, the grave accent, curly braces, vertical bar, and tilde) do not exist in PETSCII. Codes 0xA0–0xDF are allotted to CBM-specific block graphics characters—horizontal and vertical lines, hatches, shades, triangles, circles and card suits.

PETSCII also has a "shifted" mode (also called "business mode"), which changes the uppercase letters at 0x41–0x5A to lowercase, and changes the graphics at 0xC1–0xDA to uppercase letters. Upper- and lower-case are swapped from where ASCII has them. The mode is toggled by holding one of the SHIFT keys and then pressing and releasing the Commodore key. The shift can be done by POKEing location 59468 with the value 14 to select the alternative set or 12 to revert to standard. On the Commodore 64, the sets are alternated by flipping bit 2 of the byte 53272. On some models of PET, this can also be achieved via special control code PRINT CHR$(14) which adjust the line spacing as well as changing the character set; the POKE method is still available and does not alter the line spacing.

Included in PETSCII are cursor and screen control codes, such as {HOME}, {CLR}, {RVS ON}, and {RVS OFF} (the latter two activating/deactivating reverse-video character display). The control codes appeared in program listings as reverse-video graphic characters, although some computer magazines, in their efforts to provide more clearly readable listings, pretty-printed the codes using their actual names in curly braces, like the above examples. This is unambiguous as PETSCII has no curly brace characters.

Different mappings are used for storing characters (the "interchange" mapping, as used by CHR$()) and displaying characters (the "video" mapping). For example, to display the characters "@ABC" on screen by directly writing into the screen memory, one would POKE the decimal values 0, 1, 2, and 3 rather than 64, 65, 66, and 67.

The keyboard by default provides access to the lower half of the code page. Pressing Shift and a key gives the corresponding upper half code point. Some PETSCII code points cannot be printed and are only used for keyboard input (e.g. F1, RUN/STOP).

PET 2001 keyboard layout, illustrating PETSCII graphics characters

== Character set ==
The tables below represent the "interchange" PETSCII encoding, as used by CHR$().

Control characters are defined in the ranges 0x00–0x1F and 0x80–0x9F, although which control characters are defined and what they are defined as varies between systems. The tables below exclude control characters—the encoding of control characters in discussed in § Control characters.

The ranges 0x60–0x7F and 0xE0–0xFF are duplicate ranges, although what they duplicate varies between systems. On the Commodore PET, they duplicate 0x20–0x3F and 0xA0–0xBF, respectively; on the Commodore VIC-20, 64, 16, and 128 they duplicate 0xC0–0xDF and 0xA0–0xBF, respectively. While these characters are visually duplicates, they are semantically different; for example, on the Commodore PET, code points 0x2C and 0x6C both produce a comma character, but only 0x2C functions as a delimiter between input fields.

Graphic characters are mostly identical across systems, with the exceptions of 0x5C (which is \ on the Commodore PET, and £ on other systems), 0xDE (which is U+1FB95 CHECKER BOARD FILL on the Commodore PET and VIC-20, and U+1FB96 INVERSE CHECKER BOARD FILL on other systems), and the range 0x60–0x7F (which duplicates a different range on Commodore PET). Additionally, in Commodore PET 2001's shifted character set, uppercase and lowercase letters are swapped relative to other systems'.

=== Unicode equivalents ===
PETSCII characters are represented in the Unicode standard in various blocks:

- Basic Latin (U+0000 - U+007F)
- Latin-1 Supplement (U+0080 - U+00FF)
- Greek and Coptic (U+03C0 π GREEK SMALL LETTER PI)
- General Punctuation (U+2022 • BULLET)
- Arrows (two arrows, U+2190 and U+2191)
- Box Drawing (U+2500 - U+257F)
- Block Elements (U+2580 - U+259F)
- Geometric Shapes (U+25A0 - U+25FF)
- Miscellaneous Symbols (U+2600 - U+26FF)
- Dingbats (U+2713 ✓ CHECK MARK)
- Symbols for Legacy Computing (U+1FB00 - U+1FBFF, first added in 2020 as part of Unicode 13.0)

=== Standard ===
The following tables represent the PETSCII encoding used on the Commodore VIC-20, 64, 16, and 128.

==== Unshifted ====
Unshifted PETSCII
	0	1	2	3	4	5	6	7	8	9	A	B	C	D	E	F
0x																
1x																
2x	SP	!	"	#	$	%	&	'	(	)	*	+	,	-	.	/
3x	0	1	2	3	4	5	6	7	8	9	:	;	<	=	>	?
4x	@	A	B	C	D	E	F	G	H	I	J	K	L	M	N	O
5x	P	Q	R	S	T	U	V	W	X	Y	Z	[	£	]	↑	←
6x	─	♠	🭲	🭸	🭷	🭶	🭺	🭱	🭴	╮	╰	╯	🭼	╲	╱	🭽
7x	🭾	•	🭻	♥	🭰	╭	╳	○	♣	🭵	♦	┼	🮌	│	π	◥
8x																
9x																
Ax	NBSP	▌	▄	▔	▁	▏	▒	▕	🮏	◤	🮇	├	▗	└	┐	▂
Bx	┌	┴	┬	┤	▎	▍	🮈	🮂	🮃	▃	🭿	▖	▝	┘	▘	▚
Cx	─	♠	🭲	🭸	🭷	🭶	🭺	🭱	🭴	╮	╰	╯	🭼	╲	╱	🭽
Dx	🭾	•	🭻	♥	🭰	╭	╳	○	♣	🭵	♦	┼	🮌	│	π	◥
Ex	NBSP	▌	▄	▔	▁	▏	▒	▕	🮏	◤	🮇	├	▗	└	┐	▂
Fx	┌	┴	┬	┤	▎	▍	🮈	🮂	🮃	▃	🭿	▖	▝	┘	▘	π
Differs between PETSCII variants.

==== Shifted ====
Shifted PETSCII
	0	1	2	3	4	5	6	7	8	9	A	B	C	D	E	F
0x																
1x																
2x	SP	!	"	#	$	%	&	'	(	)	*	+	,	-	.	/
3x	0	1	2	3	4	5	6	7	8	9	:	;	<	=	>	?
4x	@	a	b	c	d	e	f	g	h	i	j	k	l	m	n	o
5x	p	q	r	s	t	u	v	w	x	y	z	[	£	]	↑	←
6x	─	A	B	C	D	E	F	G	H	I	J	K	L	M	N	O
7x	P	Q	R	S	T	U	V	W	X	Y	Z	┼	🮌	│	🮕/🮖 (Note: This is U+1FB95 CHECKER BOARD FILL on the VIC-20; and U+1FB96 INVERSE CHECKER BOARD FILL on the Commodore 64 and Commodore 128.)	🮘
8x																
9x																
Ax	NBSP	▌	▄	▔	▁	▏	▒	▕	🮏	🮙	🮇	├	▗	└	┐	▂
Bx	┌	┴	┬	┤	▎	▍	🮈	🮂	🮃	▃	✓	▖	▝	┘	▘	▚
Cx	─	A	B	C	D	E	F	G	H	I	J	K	L	M	N	O
Dx	P	Q	R	S	T	U	V	W	X	Y	Z	┼	🮌	│	🮕/🮖	🮘
Ex	NBSP	▌	▄	▔	▁	▏	▒	▕	🮏	🮙	🮇	├	▗	└	┐	▂
Fx	┌	┴	┬	┤	▎	▍	🮈	🮂	🮃	▃	✓	▖	▝	┘	▘	🮕/🮖
Differs between PETSCII variants.

=== Commodore PET ===
==== Unshifted ====
Unshifted PETSCII (PET)
	0	1	2	3	4	5	6	7	8	9	A	B	C	D	E	F
0x																
1x																
2x	SP	!	"	#	$	%	&	'	(	)	*	+	,	-	.	/
3x	0	1	2	3	4	5	6	7	8	9	:	;	<	=	>	?
4x	@	A	B	C	D	E	F	G	H	I	J	K	L	M	N	O
5x	P	Q	R	S	T	U	V	W	X	Y	Z	[	\	]	↑	←
6x	SP	!	"	#	$	%	&	'	(	)	*	+	,	-	.	/
7x	0	1	2	3	4	5	6	7	8	9	:	;	<	=	>	?
8x																
9x																
Ax	NBSP	▌	▄	▔	▁	▏	▒	▕	🮏	◤	🮇	├	▗	└	┐	▂
Bx	┌	┴	┬	┤	▎	▍	🮈	🮂	🮃	▃	🭿	▖	▝	┘	▘	▚
Cx	─	♠	🭲	🭸	🭷	🭶	🭺	🭱	🭴	╮	╰	╯	🭼	╲	╱	🭽
Dx	🭾	•	🭻	♥	🭰	╭	╳	○	♣	🭵	♦	┼	🮌	│	π	◥
Ex	NBSP	▌	▄	▔	▁	▏	▒	▕	🮏	◤	🮇	├	▗	└	┐	▂
Fx	┌	┴	┬	┤	▎	▍	🮈	🮂	🮃	▃	🭿	▖	▝	┘	▘	π
Differs from standard PETSCII.

==== Shifted ====
Shifted PETSCII (PET)
	0	1	2	3	4	5	6	7	8	9	A	B	C	D	E	F
0x																
1x																
2x	SP	!	"	#	$	%	&	'	(	)	*	+	,	-	.	/
3x	0	1	2	3	4	5	6	7	8	9	:	;	<	=	>	?
4x	@	a	b	c	d	e	f	g	h	i	j	k	l	m	n	o
5x	p	q	r	s	t	u	v	w	x	y	z	[	\	]	↑	←
6x	SP	!	"	#	$	%	&	'	(	)	*	+	,	-	.	/
7x	0	1	2	3	4	5	6	7	8	9	:	;	<	=	>	?
8x																
9x																
Ax	NBSP	▌	▄	▔	▁	▏	▒	▕	🮏	🮙	🮇	├	▗	└	┐	▂
Bx	┌	┴	┬	┤	▎	▍	🮈	🮂	🮃	▃	✓	▖	▝	┘	▘	▚
Cx	─	A	B	C	D	E	F	G	H	I	J	K	L	M	N	O
Dx	P	Q	R	S	T	U	V	W	X	Y	Z	┼	🮌	│	🮕	🮘
Ex	NBSP	▌	▄	▔	▁	▏	▒	▕	🮏	🮙	🮇	├	▗	└	┐	▂
Fx	┌	┴	┬	┤	▎	▍	🮈	🮂	🮃	▃	✓	▖	▝	┘	▘	🮕
Displayed case matches the Commodore PET 8032. The opposite case is used on the Commodore PET 2001. Differs from standard PETSCII.

== Control characters ==
While the graphic characters were mostly shared between Commodore systems, the control characters frequently varied. The follow table describes what the control characters represent on the Commodore PET 2001, Commodore PET 8032, VIC-20, Commodore 64, Commodore 16, Commodore 128 (40 and 80 column modes).

PETSCII control characters
Hex	Decimal	PET 2001	PET 8032	VIC-20	C64	C16	C128 (40 col)	C128 (80 col)
00	0	—N/a						
01	1	—N/a						
02	2	—N/a						UNDERLINE ON
03	3	STOP						
04	4	—N/a						
05	5	—N/a		WHITE				
06	6	—N/a						
07	7	—N/a	BELL	—N/a			BELL	
08	8	—N/a		LOCK CASE			—N/a	
09	9	—N/a	TAB	UNLOCK CASE			TAB	
0A	10	—N/a					LINE FEED	
0B	11	—N/a					UNLOCK CASE	
0C	12	—N/a					LOCK CASE	
0D	13	RETURN						
0E	14	—N/a	LOWER CASE					
0F	15	—N/a	SET WINDOW TOP	—N/a				FLASH ON
10	16	—N/a						
11	17	CURSOR DOWN						
12	18	REVERSE ON						
13	19	HOME						
14	20	DEL						
15	21	—N/a	KILL LINE	—N/a				
16	22	—N/a	ERASE TO RIGHT	—N/a				
17	23	—N/a						
18	24	—N/a			TAB SET/CLEAR			
19	25	—N/a	SCROLL UP	—N/a				
1A	26	—N/a						
1B	27	—N/a	ESC	—N/a		ESC		
1C	28	—N/a		RED				
1D	29	CURSOR RIGHT						
1E	30	—N/a		GREEN				
1F	31	—N/a		BLUE				
80	128	—N/a						
81	129	—N/a			ORANGE			DARK PURPLE
82	130	—N/a			FLASH ON	—N/a	UNDERLINE OFF	
83	131	—N/a		RUN				
84	132	—N/a			FLASH OFF	—N/a		
85	133	—N/a		F1				
86	134	—N/a		F3				
87	135	—N/a	DOUBLE BELL	F5				
88	136	—N/a		F7				
89	137	—N/a	TAB SET/CLEAR	F2				
8A	138	—N/a		F4				
8B	139	—N/a		F6				
8C	140	—N/a		F8		HELP	F8	
8D	141	SHIFT + RETURN						
8E	142	—N/a	UPPER CASE					
8F	143	—N/a	SET WINDOW END	—N/a				FLASH OFF
90	144	—N/a		BLACK				
91	145	CURSOR UP						
92	146	REVERSE OFF						
93	147	CLEAR						
94	148	INST						
95	149	—N/a	INSERT LINE ABOVE	—N/a	BROWN			DARK YELLOW
96	150	—N/a	ERASE TO LEFT	—N/a	PINK	YELLOW-GREEN	PINK	
97	151	—N/a			DARK GRAY	PINK	DARK GRAY	DARK CYAN
98	152	—N/a			MEDIUM GRAY	BLUE-GREEN	MEDIUM GRAY	
99	153	—N/a	SCROLL DOWN	—N/a	LIGHT GREEN	LIGHT BLUE	LIGHT GREEN	
9A	154	—N/a			LIGHT BLUE	DARK BLUE	LIGHT BLUE	
9B	155	—N/a			LIGHT GRAY	LIGHT GREEN	LIGHT GRAY	
9C	156	—N/a		PURPLE				
9D	157	CURSOR LEFT						
9E	158	—N/a		YELLOW				
9F	159	—N/a		CYAN				

The colors of the VIC-20 and C64/128 are listed in the VIC-II article.

== Base 128 ==
Out of PETSCII's first 192 codes, there are 128 graphic characters: 32–127 and 160–192. This permits "base128"-style encodings in DATA statements, or perhaps between PETSCII-speaking machines. This can also include control characters, which are visible when quoted, although which control characters are defined varies between systems.

The primary application for a "Base 128" encoding is in DATA statements in Commodore BASIC. Binary data can be stored with relatively low overhead, allowing one character of data to encode seven bits of data. On a standard 80-character line, typically four characters are used for the line number, and two characters for the abbreviated DATA statement (dA). Since the comma and colon are significant to BASIC, a quote character is also needed, leaving 73 characters for data. At seven bits per character, one DATA line could store 511 bits of binary data, for 79% efficiency. If three-digit line numbers are used, efficiency increases to 80%. If two-digit line numbers are used, efficiency is 82%.

Line Numbers	Data chars per Line	Bits per Line	Efficiency	Max. Lines	Max. Total Data Bytes
1-9 (Note: Assume line 0 is a GOTO.)	76	532	0.83125	9	598
10-99	75	525	0.820312	90	5,906
100-999	74	518	0.809375	900	58,275
1000-9999	73	511	0.7984375	9,000	574,875
10000-65535 (Note: Maximum line number is probably off-by-one.)	72	504	0.7875	55,536	3.5 MB (approx.)

For storing binary data in Commodore BASIC, it appears that two- or three-digit line numbers are typically the best choice.

=== Base 164 ===
164 PETSCII characters are representable in quoted strings; theoretically, then, Base 164 is possible. This adds in the color values, the function keys, and cursor controls.

== See also ==
- ATASCII
- Atari ST character set
- ZX Spectrum character set
- Extended ASCII
- Text semigraphics
