= Code page 922 =

Code page for the Estonian language

Estonia ISO-8
- Alias(es): CP 922, IBM 00922
- Language: Estonian
- Based on: ISO/IEC 8859-1
- Succeeded by: CP 902
- Other related encodings: Windows-1257 (LST 1590-3), ISO/IEC 8859-13

Estonia ISO-8 with euro
- Alias(es): CP 902, IBM 00902
- Language: Estonian
- Preceded by: CP 922
- Other related encodings: Windows-1257 (LST 1590-3), ISO/IEC 8859-13

Code page 922 (CCSID 922) (also known as CP 922, IBM 00922, and Estonia ISO-8) is a code page used under IBM AIX and DOS to write the Estonian language. It is an extension and modification of ISO/IEC 8859-1, where the letters Ð/ð and Þ/þ used for Icelandic are replaced by the letters Š/š and Ž/ž respectively. This matches the encoding of these letters in Windows-1257 (LST 1590-3) and ISO/IEC 8859-13.

Code page 902 (CCSID 902) is the euro currency update of code page/CCSID 922. In that code page, the "¤" (currency) character at code point A4 is replaced with the "€" (euro) character.

Code page 922
	0	1	2	3	4	5	6	7	8	9	A	B	C	D	E	F
0x		☺	☻	♥	♦	♣	♠	•	◘	○	◙	♂	♀	♪	♫	☼
1x	►	◄	↕	‼	¶	§	▬	↨	↑	↓	→	←	∟	↔	▲	▼
2x	SP	!	"	#	$	%	&	'	(	)	*	+	,	-	.	/
3x	0	1	2	3	4	5	6	7	8	9	:	;	<	=	>	?
4x	@	A	B	C	D	E	F	G	H	I	J	K	L	M	N	O
5x	P	Q	R	S	T	U	V	W	X	Y	Z	[	\	]		_
6x	`	a	b	c	d	e	f	g	h	i	j	k	l	m	n	o
7x	p	q	r	s	t	u	v	w	x	y	z	{	|	}	~	
8x	░	▒	▓	│	┤	┘	┌	█	▄	╣	║	╗	╝	▀	≥	┐
9x	└	┴	┬	├	─	┼	■	‗	╚	╔	╩	╦	╠	═	╬	≤
Ax	NBSP	¡	¢	£	¤	¥	¦	§	¨	©	ª	«	¬	SHY	®	¯
Bx	°	±	²	³	´	µ	¶	·	¸	¹	º	»	¼	½	¾	¿
Cx	À	Á	Â	Ã	Ä	Å	Æ	Ç	È	É	Ê	Ë	Ì	Í	Î	Ï
Dx	Š	Ñ	Ò	Ó	Ô	Õ	Ö	×	Ø	Ù	Ú	Û	Ü	Ý	Ž	ß
Ex	à	á	â	ã	ä	å	æ	ç	è	é	ê	ë	ì	í	î	ï
Fx	š	ñ	ò	ó	ô	õ	ö	÷	ø	ù	ú	û	ü	ý	ž	ÿ

Differences from ISO/IEC 8859-1
