= Symbols for Legacy Computing Supplement =

- Range: U+1CC00..U+1CEBF (704 code points)
- Plane: SMP
- Scripts: Common
- Assigned: 695 code points
- Unused: 9 reserved code points

Unicode Version History
- 16.0 (2024): 686 (+686)
- 17.0 (2025): 695 (+9)

Unicode documentation
- Code chart ∣ Web page

Symbols for Legacy Computing Supplement is a Unicode block containing additional graphic characters that were used for various home computers from the 1970s and 1980s, extending the set of characters provided by the Symbols for Legacy Computing block.

It includes characters from Amstrad CPC, Apple 8-bit, Kaypro CP/M, Mattel Aquarius, Ohio Scientific, Robotron KC, Sharp MZ computers, HP terminals, and TRS-80. It includes a set of semigraphics in the form of 230 "octant" characters, large images split into four "characters", and the "large type" characters used for building large text characters.

== Block ==
Symbols for Legacy Computing Supplement^{[1]}^{[2]} Official Unicode Consortium code chart (PDF)
	0	1	2	3	4	5	6	7	8	9	A	B	C	D	E	F
U+1CC0x	𜰀	𜰁	𜰂	𜰃	𜰄	𜰅	𜰆	𜰇	𜰈	𜰉	𜰊	𜰋	𜰌	𜰍	𜰎	𜰏
U+1CC1x	𜰐	𜰑	𜰒	𜰓	𜰔	𜰕	𜰖	𜰗	𜰘	𜰙	𜰚	𜰛	𜰜	𜰝	𜰞	𜰟
U+1CC2x	𜰠	𜰡	𜰢	𜰣	𜰤	𜰥	𜰦	𜰧	𜰨	𜰩	𜰪	𜰫	𜰬	𜰭	𜰮	𜰯
U+1CC3x	𜰰	𜰱	𜰲	𜰳	𜰴	𜰵	𜰶	𜰷	𜰸	𜰹	𜰺	𜰻	𜰼	𜰽	𜰾	𜰿
U+1CC4x	𜱀	𜱁	𜱂	𜱃	𜱄	𜱅	𜱆	𜱇	𜱈	𜱉	𜱊	𜱋	𜱌	𜱍	𜱎	𜱏
U+1CC5x	𜱐	𜱑	𜱒	𜱓	𜱔	𜱕	𜱖	𜱗	𜱘	𜱙	𜱚	𜱛	𜱜	𜱝	𜱞	𜱟
U+1CC6x	𜱠	𜱡	𜱢	𜱣	𜱤	𜱥	𜱦	𜱧	𜱨	𜱩	𜱪	𜱫	𜱬	𜱭	𜱮	𜱯
U+1CC7x	𜱰	𜱱	𜱲	𜱳	𜱴	𜱵	𜱶	𜱷	𜱸	𜱹	𜱺	𜱻	𜱼	𜱽	𜱾	𜱿
U+1CC8x	𜲀	𜲁	𜲂	𜲃	𜲄	𜲅	𜲆	𜲇	𜲈	𜲉	𜲊	𜲋	𜲌	𜲍	𜲎	𜲏
U+1CC9x	𜲐	𜲑	𜲒	𜲓	𜲔	𜲕	𜲖	𜲗	𜲘	𜲙	𜲚	𜲛	𜲜	𜲝	𜲞	𜲟
U+1CCAx	𜲠	𜲡	𜲢	𜲣	𜲤	𜲥	𜲦	𜲧	𜲨	𜲩	𜲪	𜲫	𜲬	𜲭	𜲮	𜲯
U+1CCBx	𜲰	𜲱	𜲲	𜲳	𜲴	𜲵	𜲶	𜲷	𜲸	𜲹	𜲺	𜲻	𜲼	𜲽	𜲾	𜲿
U+1CCCx	𜳀	𜳁	𜳂	𜳃	𜳄	𜳅	𜳆	𜳇	𜳈	𜳉	𜳊	𜳋	𜳌	𜳍	𜳎	𜳏
U+1CCDx	𜳐	𜳑	𜳒	𜳓	𜳔	𜳕	𜳖	𜳗	𜳘	𜳙	𜳚	𜳛	𜳜	𜳝	𜳞	𜳟
U+1CCEx	𜳠	𜳡	𜳢	𜳣	𜳤	𜳥	𜳦	𜳧	𜳨	𜳩	𜳪	𜳫	𜳬	𜳭	𜳮	𜳯
U+1CCFx	𜳰	𜳱	𜳲	𜳳	𜳴	𜳵	𜳶	𜳷	𜳸	𜳹	𜳺	𜳻	𜳼			
U+1CD0x	𜴀	𜴁	𜴂	𜴃	𜴄	𜴅	𜴆	𜴇	𜴈	𜴉	𜴊	𜴋	𜴌	𜴍	𜴎	𜴏
U+1CD1x	𜴐	𜴑	𜴒	𜴓	𜴔	𜴕	𜴖	𜴗	𜴘	𜴙	𜴚	𜴛	𜴜	𜴝	𜴞	𜴟
U+1CD2x	𜴠	𜴡	𜴢	𜴣	𜴤	𜴥	𜴦	𜴧	𜴨	𜴩	𜴪	𜴫	𜴬	𜴭	𜴮	𜴯
U+1CD3x	𜴰	𜴱	𜴲	𜴳	𜴴	𜴵	𜴶	𜴷	𜴸	𜴹	𜴺	𜴻	𜴼	𜴽	𜴾	𜴿
U+1CD4x	𜵀	𜵁	𜵂	𜵃	𜵄	𜵅	𜵆	𜵇	𜵈	𜵉	𜵊	𜵋	𜵌	𜵍	𜵎	𜵏
U+1CD5x	𜵐	𜵑	𜵒	𜵓	𜵔	𜵕	𜵖	𜵗	𜵘	𜵙	𜵚	𜵛	𜵜	𜵝	𜵞	𜵟
U+1CD6x	𜵠	𜵡	𜵢	𜵣	𜵤	𜵥	𜵦	𜵧	𜵨	𜵩	𜵪	𜵫	𜵬	𜵭	𜵮	𜵯
U+1CD7x	𜵰	𜵱	𜵲	𜵳	𜵴	𜵵	𜵶	𜵷	𜵸	𜵹	𜵺	𜵻	𜵼	𜵽	𜵾	𜵿
U+1CD8x	𜶀	𜶁	𜶂	𜶃	𜶄	𜶅	𜶆	𜶇	𜶈	𜶉	𜶊	𜶋	𜶌	𜶍	𜶎	𜶏
U+1CD9x	𜶐	𜶑	𜶒	𜶓	𜶔	𜶕	𜶖	𜶗	𜶘	𜶙	𜶚	𜶛	𜶜	𜶝	𜶞	𜶟
U+1CDAx	𜶠	𜶡	𜶢	𜶣	𜶤	𜶥	𜶦	𜶧	𜶨	𜶩	𜶪	𜶫	𜶬	𜶭	𜶮	𜶯
U+1CDBx	𜶰	𜶱	𜶲	𜶳	𜶴	𜶵	𜶶	𜶷	𜶸	𜶹	𜶺	𜶻	𜶼	𜶽	𜶾	𜶿
U+1CDCx	𜷀	𜷁	𜷂	𜷃	𜷄	𜷅	𜷆	𜷇	𜷈	𜷉	𜷊	𜷋	𜷌	𜷍	𜷎	𜷏
U+1CDDx	𜷐	𜷑	𜷒	𜷓	𜷔	𜷕	𜷖	𜷗	𜷘	𜷙	𜷚	𜷛	𜷜	𜷝	𜷞	𜷟
U+1CDEx	𜷠	𜷡	𜷢	𜷣	𜷤	𜷥	𜷦	𜷧	𜷨	𜷩	𜷪	𜷫	𜷬	𜷭	𜷮	𜷯
U+1CDFx	𜷰	𜷱	𜷲	𜷳	𜷴	𜷵	𜷶	𜷷	𜷸	𜷹	𜷺	𜷻	𜷼	𜷽	𜷾	𜷿
U+1CE0x	𜸀	𜸁	𜸂	𜸃	𜸄	𜸅	𜸆	𜸇	𜸈	𜸉	𜸊	𜸋	𜸌	𜸍	𜸎	𜸏
U+1CE1x	𜸐	𜸑	𜸒	𜸓	𜸔	𜸕	𜸖	𜸗	𜸘	𜸙	𜸚	𜸛	𜸜	𜸝	𜸞	𜸟
U+1CE2x	𜸠	𜸡	𜸢	𜸣	𜸤	𜸥	𜸦	𜸧	𜸨	𜸩	𜸪	𜸫	𜸬	𜸭	𜸮	𜸯
U+1CE3x	𜸰	𜸱	𜸲	𜸳	𜸴	𜸵	𜸶	𜸷	𜸸	𜸹	𜸺	𜸻	𜸼	𜸽	𜸾	𜸿
U+1CE4x	𜹀	𜹁	𜹂	𜹃	𜹄	𜹅	𜹆	𜹇	𜹈	𜹉	𜹊	𜹋	𜹌	𜹍	𜹎	𜹏
U+1CE5x	𜹐	𜹑	𜹒	𜹓	𜹔	𜹕	𜹖	𜹗	𜹘	𜹙	𜹚	𜹛	𜹜	𜹝	𜹞	𜹟
U+1CE6x	𜹠	𜹡	𜹢	𜹣	𜹤	𜹥	𜹦	𜹧	𜹨	𜹩	𜹪	𜹫	𜹬	𜹭	𜹮	𜹯
U+1CE7x	𜹰	𜹱	𜹲	𜹳	𜹴	𜹵	𜹶	𜹷	𜹸	𜹹	𜹺	𜹻	𜹼	𜹽	𜹾	𜹿
U+1CE8x	𜺀	𜺁	𜺂	𜺃	𜺄	𜺅	𜺆	𜺇	𜺈	𜺉	𜺊	𜺋	𜺌	𜺍	𜺎	𜺏
U+1CE9x	𜺐	𜺑	𜺒	𜺓	𜺔	𜺕	𜺖	𜺗	𜺘	𜺙	𜺚	𜺛	𜺜	𜺝	𜺞	𜺟
U+1CEAx	𜺠	𜺡	𜺢	𜺣	𜺤	𜺥	𜺦	𜺧	𜺨	𜺩	𜺪	𜺫	𜺬	𜺭	𜺮	𜺯
U+1CEBx	𜺰	𜺱	𜺲	𜺳							𜺺	𜺻	𜺼	𜺽	𜺾	𜺿
Notes 1.As of Unicode version 18.0 2.Grey areas indicate non-assigned code points

The image below is provided as quick reference for these symbols on systems that are unable to display them directly:

== History ==
The following Unicode-related documents record the purpose and process of defining specific characters in the Symbols for Legacy Computing Supplement block:

Version	Final code points (Note: Proposed code points and characters names may differ from final code points and names)	Count	L2 ID	Document
16.0	U+1CC00..1CCF9, 1CD00..1CEAF	682	L2/21-235 (full, no_attach, sources, mappings_zip)	Bettencourt, Rebecca; Ewell, Doug; Bánffy, Ricardo; Everson, Michael; Hietaniemi, Jarkko; Silva, Eduardo Marín; Mårtenson, Elias; Shoulson, Mark; Steele, Shawn; Turner, Rebecca (2021-12-20), Proposal to add further characters from legacy computers and teletext to the UCS
16.0	U+1CC00..1CCF9, 1CD00..1CEAF	682	L2/22-023	Anderson, Deborah; Whistler, Ken; Pournader, Roozbeh; Constable, Peter (2022-01-22), "17 Legacy Computing Symbols", Recommendations to UTC #170 January 2022 on Script Proposals
16.0	U+1CC00..1CCF9, 1CD00..1CEAF	682	L2/21-235R (full, no_attach)	Bettencourt, Rebecca; Ewell, Doug; Bánffy, Ricardo; Everson, Michael; Hietaniemi, Jarkko; Silva, Eduardo Marín; Mårtenson, Elias; Shoulson, Mark; Steele, Shawn; Turner, Rebecca (2022-01-26), Proposal to add further characters from legacy computers and teletext to the UCS
16.0	U+1CC00..1CCF9, 1CD00..1CEAF	682	L2/22-016	Constable, Peter (2022-04-21), "D.1 17 Legacy Computing Symbols", UTC #170 Minutes
16.0	U+1CC00..1CCF9, 1CD00..1CEAF	682	L2/23-012	Anderson, Deborah; et al. (2023-01-17), "10 Legacy Computing Symbols", Recommendations to UTC #174 January 2023 on Script Proposals
16.0	U+1CC00..1CCF9, 1CD00..1CEAF	682	L2/23-005	Constable, Peter (2023-02-01), "Consensus 174-C24", UTC #174 Minutes, "The UTC accepts the name change for U+1CE35 from LARGE TYPE PIECE RAISED UPPER RIGHT ARC to LARGE TYPE PIECE RAISED UPPER LEFT ARC"
16.0	U+1CC00..1CCF9, 1CD00..1CEAF	682	L2/23-164	Anderson, Deborah; Kučera, Jan; Whistler, Ken; Pournader, Roozbeh; Constable, Peter (2023-07-21), "13 Symbols for Legacy Computers Supplement", Recommendations to UTC #176 July 2023 on Script Proposals
16.0	U+1CC00..1CCF9, 1CD00..1CEAF	682	L2/23-157	Constable, Peter (2023-07-31), "Consensus 176-C37", UTC #176 Minutes, "Change the name of U+1CE07 TOP RIGHT BLACK LEFT-POINTING SMALL TRIANGLE to TOP LEFT BLACK LEFT-POINTING SMALL TRIANGLE"
16.0	U+1CEB0..1CEB3	4	L2/21-234 (full, no_attach, sources, mappings_zip)	Bettencourt, Rebecca; Ewell, Doug; Bánffy, Ricardo; Everson, Michael; Hietaniemi, Jarkko; Silva, Eduardo Marín; Mårtenson, Elias; Shoulson, Mark; Steele, Shawn; Turner, Rebecca (2021-12-20), Proposal to add characters from Smalltalk to the UCS
16.0	U+1CEB0..1CEB3	4	L2/22-023	Anderson, Deborah; Whistler, Ken; Pournader, Roozbeh; Constable, Peter (2022-01-22), "20 Smalltalk", Recommendations to UTC #170 January 2022 on Script Proposals
16.0	U+1CEB0..1CEB3	4	L2/22-016	Constable, Peter (2022-04-21), "Consensus 170-C17", UTC #170 Minutes, "UTC accepts ... 5 Smalltalk symbols"
17.0	U+1CCFA..1CCFC, 1CEBA..1CEBF	9	L2/23-142	Buff, Charlotte (2023-06-26), Proposal to Define Variation Sequences for Emoji Mapped to Legacy Computing Symbols
17.0	U+1CCFA..1CCFC, 1CEBA..1CEBF	9	L2/23-157	Constable, Peter (2023-07-31), "G.3", UTC #176 Minutes
17.0	U+1CCFA..1CCFC, 1CEBA..1CEBF	9	L2/23-252	Bettencourt, Rebecca; Ewell, Doug (2023-10-14), Proposal to disunify Symbols for Legacy Computing from emoji
17.0	U+1CCFA..1CCFC, 1CEBA..1CEBF	9	L2/23-238R	Anderson, Deborah; Kučera, Jan; Whistler, Ken; Pournader, Roozbeh; Constable, Peter (2023-11-01), "14 Symbols", Recommendations to UTC #177 November 2023 on Script Proposals
17.0	U+1CCFA..1CCFC, 1CEBA..1CEBF	9	L2/23-231	Constable, Peter (2023-12-08), "Consensus 177-C35", UTC #177 Minutes

== Implementation ==
The glyphs for the Symbols for Legacy Computing Supplement block have been added to the Cascadia Code (2404.03 release or later), GNU Unifont (version 16.0.01 or higher), BabelStone Pseudographica (version 16.0.0) and Iosevka fonts.

== See also ==
- Box-drawing characters
- Dingbat
- other Unicode blocks
  - Symbols for Legacy Computing
  - Box Drawing
  - Block Elements
  - Geometric Shapes
  - Halfwidth and Fullwidth Forms
  - Supplemental Arrows-C
