= MouseText =

Character set

MouseText is a set of 32 graphical characters designed by Bruce Tognazzini and first implemented in the Apple IIc. They were then added to the Apple IIe forming part of the Enhanced IIe upgrade. A slightly revised version was then released with the Apple IIGS.

By including box-drawing characters, MouseText made it possible to display simple text user interfaces resembling the Macintosh graphical user interface. Since the Apples lacked the ability to display user-defined characters in text mode, all GUI-like displays beyond crude ASCII art approximations had to use the slower and more memory-hungry graphical mode before MouseText was available. MouseText resulted in an eightfold increase in display speed for mouse applications, bringing such text-based applications as word processors up to the same speed as the original Macintosh. Word processors running on the two computers would not be confused with one another, however, as the mouse under MouseText would move in discrete jumps from character cell to character cell, rather than the smooth movement of the Macintosh, and text was still monospaced.

== Running Man ==
The original version of MouseText in the Apple IIc included a depiction of a figure running, perhaps to portray the action of running a program. This icon was later found to be unnecessary, and Tognazzini sent a letter to Call-A.P.P.L.E. magazine warning developers not to use them, as they would be replaced.

The MouseText characters replaced a redundant set of inverse uppercase characters (@,A..Z,[,\,],^,_) in the Alternate character set.

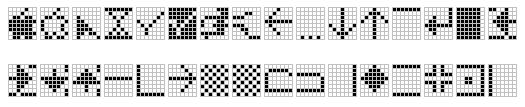
Original MouseText with Running Man

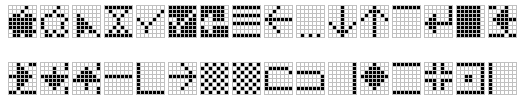
Revised MouseText found in Apple IIGS

== Accessing MouseText characters ==
There are two main ways to put MouseText characters on the screen.

- Enable the alternate character set by writing to location 0xC00F (49167). Then write values in the 0x40 (64) through 0x5F (95) range to the screen.
- Enable the 80-column firmware (which also enables the alternate character set), and use the control character sequence 0x0F, 0x1B (15, 27) to turn inverse and MouseText printing on, followed by characters in the @,A..Z,[,\,],^,_ set, followed by the sequence 0x18, 0x0E (24, 14) to turn MouseText and inverse printing off. (Other methods of turning inverse printing on and off may also be used.)

For example, in Applesoft BASIC the following code fragment will display the MouseText representation of a folder:

]PR#3

]INVERSE : PRINT CHR$(27);"XY";CHR$(24); : NORMAL

== Inclusion in Unicode ==
Version 13.0 of the Unicode Standard, released March 2020, includes all of the MouseText characters except the two Apple logos, mostly in the Symbols for Legacy Computing block.

Original MouseText with Running Man
	0	1	2	3	4	5	6	7	8	9	A	B	C	D	E	F
4x	� (Note: The Apple logo. Not included in Unicode.)	�	🮰	⌛︎	✓	🮱	🮲	🮳	←	…	↓	↑	🭶	↵	▉	🮵
5x	🮶	🮷	🮸	🭸	🭼	→	🮖	🮕	🮹	🮺	▕	◆	🮀	🮻	🮼	▏

Revised MouseText found in Apple IIGS
	0	1	2	3	4	5	6	7	8	9	A	B	C	D	E	F
4x	�	�	🮰	⌛︎	✓	🮱	🮴	🮁	←	…	↓	↑	🭶	↵	▉	🮵
5x	🮶	🮷	🮸	🭸	🭼	→	🮖	🮕	🮹	🮺	▕	◆	🮀	🮻	🮼	▏

== See also ==
- Apple II character set
- Marlett, a TrueType font used in Microsoft Windows for rendering scalable UI elements
