= Mahjong Tiles =

Mahjong Tiles refers to:

- Mahjong tiles, the tiles used to play Mahjong games.
- Mahjong Tiles, a block of 44 Unicode characters representing the tiles used in Mahjong games in print text.
