= Code page 437 =

Character set of the original IBM PC

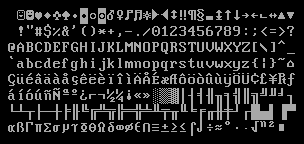
- Code page 437, as rendered by an IBM PC using standard VGA
- MIME / IANA: IBM437
- Alias(es): cp437, 437, csPC8CodePage437, OEM-US
- Languages: English, German, Swedish
- Classification: Extended ASCII, OEM code page
- Extends: US-ASCII
- Other related encoding: Code page 850,

Code page 437 (CCSID 437) is the character set of the original IBM PC (personal computer). It is also known as CP437, OEM-US, OEM 437, PC-8, or MS-DOS Latin US. The set includes all printable ASCII characters as well as some accented letters (diacritics), Greek letters, icons, and line-drawing symbols. It is sometimes referred to as the "OEM font" or "high ASCII", or as "extended ASCII" (one of many mutually incompatible ASCII extensions).

This character set remains the primary set in the core of any EGA and VGA-compatible graphics card. As such, text shown when a PC reboots, before fonts can be loaded and rendered, is typically rendered using this character set. (Note: Systems available in Eastern European, Arabic, and Asian countries often use a different set; however, these sets are designed to match 437 as much as possible. The designation "OEM", for "original equipment manufacturer", indicates that the set could be changed by the manufacturer to meet different markets.) Many file formats developed at the time of the IBM PC are based on code page 437 as well.

== Display adapters ==
The original IBM PC contained this font as a 9×14 pixels-per-character font stored in the ROM of the IBM Monochrome Display Adapter (MDA) and an 8×8 pixels-per-character font of the Color Graphics Adapter (CGA) cards. The IBM Enhanced Graphics Adapter (EGA) contained an 8×14 pixels-per-character version and—for the CGA compatible modes—an 8x8 pixels-per-character version.. The VGA contained a 9×16 version.

All these display adapters have text modes in which each character cell contains an 8-bit character code point (see details), giving 256 possible values for graphic characters. All 256 codes were assigned a graphical character in ROM, including the codes from 0 to 31 that were reserved in ASCII for non-graphical control characters.

Various Eastern European PCs used different character sets, sometimes user-selectable via jumpers or CMOS setup. These sets were designed to match 437 as much as possible, for instance sharing the code points for many of the line-drawing characters, while still allowing text in a local language to be displayed.

== Alt codes ==
A legacy of code page 437 is the number combinations used in Windows Alt codes. A DOS user could enter a character by holding down the Alt key and entering the character code on the numpad and many users memorized the numbers needed for CP437 (or for the similar CP850). Although Microsoft Windows used different character sets such as CP1252, the original numbers were emulated so users could continue to use them; Microsoft added the ability to type a code from the Windows character set by typing 0 before the digits.

== Character set ==
The following tables show code page 437. Each character is shown with its equivalent Unicode code point (when it is not equal to the character's code). A tooltip, generally available only when one points to the immediate left of the character, shows the Unicode code point name and the decimal Alt code. See also the notes below, as there are multiple equivalent Unicode characters for some code points.

Although the ROM provides a graphic for all 256 different possible 8-bit codes, some APIs will not print some code points, in particular the range 0-31 and the code at 127. Instead, they will interpret them as control characters. For instance, many methods of outputting text on the original IBM PC would interpret hex codes 07, 08, 0A, and 0D as BEL, BS, LF, and CR, respectively. Many printers were also unable to print these characters.

Code page 437
| | 0 | 1 | 2 | 3 | 4 | 5 | 6 | 7 | 8 | 9 | A | B | C | D | E | F |
|---|---|---|---|---|---|---|---|---|---|---|---|---|---|---|---|---|
| 0x 0 | NUL (Note: 0 draws a blank space, but usage as the C string terminator means it is more accurately translated as NUL. In their code-page-437-based implementation of C0-region graphics, Star Micronics printers re-purpose this code as a slashed zero.) | ☺︎ 263A | ☻ 263B | ♥︎ 2665 | ♦︎ 2666 | ♣︎ 2663 | ♠︎ 2660 | • 2022 | ◘ 25D8 | ○ 25CB | ◙ 25D9 | ♂︎ 2642 | ♀︎ 2640 | ♪ 266A | ♫ (Note: 14 (E_{hex}) Mapping as shown, to the beamed eighth notes [U+266B, ♫], follows data provided by the Unicode Consortium. In IBM's GCGID (Graphic Character Global IDentifier) system of character IDs, this is SM910000, simply annotated as "Two Musical Notes"; however, the reference glyph shows two beamed sixteenth notes [U+266C, ♬]. In the specification for IBM Japanese Host code, SM910080 (i.e. SM910000 with the fullwidth attribute set) is explicitly mapped to U+266C, and accordingly shows two semiquavers.) 266B | ☼ 263C |
| 1x 16 | ► 25BA | ◄ 25C4 | ↕︎ 2195 | ‼︎ 203C | ¶ 00B6 | § 00A7 | ▬ 25AC | ↨ 21A8 | ↑ 2191 | ↓ 2193 | → 2192 | ← 2190 | ∟ 221F | ↔︎ 2194 | ▲25B2 | ▼25BC |
| 2x 32 | SP | ! | " | # | $ | % | & | ' | ( | ) | * | + | , | - | . | / |
| 3x 48 | 0 | 1 | 2 | 3 | 4 | 5 | 6 | 7 | 8 | 9 | : | ; | < | = | > | ? |
| 4x 64 | @ | A | B | C | D | E | F | G | H | I | J | K | L | M | N | O |
| 5x 80 | P | Q | R | S | T | U | V | W | X | Y | Z | [ | \ | ] | | _ |
| 6x 96 | ` | a | b | c | d | e | f | g | h | i | j | k | l | m | n | o |
| 7x 112 | p | q | r | s | t | u | v | w | x | y | z | { | | (Note: 124 (7C_{hex}) The actual glyph at this position is a broken bar [U+00A6, ¦] in the original IBM PC and compatibles font, as rendered by the original MDA. This rendering was later adopted for CGA, EGA and VGA (see image at the beginning of the article). However, almost all software assumes this code is the ASCII character [U+007C, |]; for example, programming languages use it as "or". In the early 1990s, it was clarified that there is vertical bar in ASCII at this position and that the broken bar symbol is not part of ASCII.) | } | ~ | ⌂ (Note: 127 (7F_{hex}) is a "house" but was also sometimes used as Greek capital delta [U+0394, Δ].) 2302 |
| 8x 128 | Ç 00C7 | ü 00FC | é 00E9 | â 00E2 | ä 00E4 | à 00E0 | å 00E5 | ç 00E7 | ê 00EA | ë 00EB | è 00E8 | ï 00EF | î 00EE | ì 00EC | Ä 00C4 | Å 00C5 |
| 9x 144 | É 00C9 | æ 00E6 | Æ 00C6 | ô 00F4 | ö 00F6 | ò 00F2 | û 00FB | ù 00F9 | ÿ 00FF | Ö 00D6 | Ü 00DC | ¢ 00A2 | £ 00A3 | ¥ 00A5 | ₧ 20A7 | ƒ 0192 |
| Ax 160 | á 00E1 | í 00ED | ó 00F3 | ú 00FA | ñ 00F1 | Ñ 00D1 | ª 00AA | º 00BA | ¿ 00BF | ⌐ 2310 | ¬ 00AC | ½ 00BD | ¼ 00BC | ¡ 00A1 | « 00AB | » 00BB |
| Bx 176 | ░ 2591 | ▒ 2592 | ▓ 2593 | │ (Note: 179 (B3_{hex}) Could also serve as an integral extension [U+23AE, ⎮] in IBM's font.) 2502 | ┤ 2524 | ╡ 2561 | ╢ 2562 | ╖ 2556 | ╕ 2555 | ╣ 2563 | ║ 2551 | ╗ 2557 | ╝ 255D | ╜ 255C | ╛ 255B | ┐ 2510 |
| Cx 192 | └ 2514 | ┴ 2534 | ┬ 252C | ├ 251C | ─ 2500 | ┼ 253C | ╞ 255E | ╟ 255F | ╚ 255A | ╔ 2554 | ╩ 2569 | ╦ 2566 | ╠ 2560 | ═ 2550 | ╬ 256C | ╧ 2567 |
| Dx 208 | ╨ 2568 | ╤ 2564 | ╥ 2565 | ╙ 2559 | ╘ 2558 | ╒ 2552 | ╓ 2553 | ╫ 256B | ╪ 256A | ┘ 2518 | ┌ 250C | █ 2588 | ▄ 2584 | ▌ 258C | ▐ 2590 | ▀ 2580 |
| Ex 224 | α 03B1 | ß (Note: Comparison of characters in the E0 to EF range across various IBM products. 225 (E1_{hex}) is identified by IBM as Latin "Sharp s Small" [U+00DF, ß] but is sometimes rendered in OEM fonts as Greek small beta [U+03B2, β]. The placement of this Latin character among Greek characters suggests intended multi-use.) 00DF | Γ 0393 | π (Note: 227 (E3_{hex}) is identified by IBM as Greek "Pi Small" [U+03C0, π] but is sometimes rendered in OEM fonts as Greek capital pi [U+03A0, Π] or the n-ary product sign [U+220F, ∏].) 03C0 | Σ (Note: 228 (E4_{hex}) is identified by IBM as Greek "Sigma Capital" [U+03A3, Σ] but is also used as the n-ary summation sign [U+2211, ∑].) 03A3 | σ 03C3 | µ (Note: 230 (E6_{hex}) is identified by IBM as Greek "Mu Small" [U+03BC, μ] but is also used as the micro sign [U+00B5, µ]. IBM's Greek GCGID table maps the character in this code page to the Greek letter, but the cp437_DOSLatinUS to Unicode table maps it to the micro sign.) 00B5 | τ 03C4 | Φ 03A6 | Θ (Note: 233 (E9_{hex}) is identified by IBM as Greek "Theta Capital" [U+0398, Θ]. However, these symbols are for mathematics and physics, in which lowercase theta is much more commonly used (e.g. for polar coordinates).) 0398 | Ω (Note: 234 (EA_{hex}) is identified by IBM as Greek "Omega Capital" [U+03A9, Ω] but is also used as the ohm sign [U+2126, Ω]. Unicode considers the characters to be equivalent and suggests that U+03A9 be used in both contexts.) 03A9 | δ (Note: 235 (EB_{hex}) is identified by IBM as Greek "Delta Small" [U+03B4, δ]. It was also unofficially used for the small eth [U+00F0, ð] and the partial derivative sign [U+2202, ∂]) 03B4 | ∞ 221E | φ (Note: 237 (ED_{hex}) is identified by IBM as Greek "Phi Small (Closed Form)" [U+03D5, ϕ; or, from the italicized math set, U+1D719, 𝜙] but, Unicode maps it to the open (or "loopy") form [U+03C6, φ] in its cp437_DOSLatinUS table. Comparison of IBM's Greek GCGID table with Unicode's Greek code chart shows where IBM, for example, reversed the open and closed forms when mapping to Unicode. This character is also used as the empty set sign [U+2205, ∅], the diameter sign [U+2300, ⌀], and the Latin letter O with stroke [U+00D8, Ø; and U+00F8, ø].) 03C6 | ε (Note: 238 (EE_{hex}) is identified by IBM as Greek "Epsilon Small" [U+03B5, ε] but is sometimes rendered in OEM fonts as the element-of sign [U+2208, ∈]. It was often used as the euro sign [U+20AC, €]) 03B5 | ∩ 2229 |
| Fx 240 | ≡ 2261 | ± 00B1 | ≥ 2265 | ≤ 2264 | ⌠ (Note: 244 (F4_{hex}) and 245 (F5_{hex}) are the upper and lower portion of the integral symbol (∫), and they can be extended with the character 179 (B3_{hex}), the vertical line of the box drawing block. 244 could also be used for the long s character [U+017F, ſ].) 2320 | ⌡ 2321 | ÷ 00F7 | ≈ 2248 | ° 00B0 | ∙ (Note: 249 (F9_{hex}) and 250 (FA_{hex}) are almost indistinguishable: the first is a slightly larger dot than the second, both were used as bullets, middle dot, and multiplication dot [U+2219, ∙]) 2219 | · 00B7 | √ (Note: 251 (FB_{hex}) was also sometimes used as a check mark [U+2713, ✓].) 221A | ⁿ 207F | ² 00B2 | ■ 25A0 | NBSP (Note: 255 (FF_{hex}) draws a blank space; the use as non-breaking space (NBSP) has precedent in word processors designed for the IBM PC.); 00A0 |

Symbols and punctuation

When translating to Unicode some codes do not have a unique, single Unicode equivalent; the correct choice may depend upon context.

== History ==
The repertoire of code page 437 was partially taken from the character set of Wang word-processing machines (WISCII), according to Bill Gates in an interview with Gates and Paul Allen that appeared in the 2 October 1995 edition of Fortune Magazine:

"... We were also fascinated by dedicated word processors from Wang, because we believed that general-purpose machines could do that just as well. That's why, when it came time to design the keyboard for the IBM PC, we put the funny Wang character set into the machine—you know, smiley faces and boxes and triangles and stuff. We were thinking we'd like to do a clone of Wang word-processing software someday."

However, Gates's account has been challenged as partially inaccurate since the WISCII character set does not include smiley faces or box-drawing characters.

According to an interview with David J. Bradley (developer of the PC's ROM-BIOS) the characters were decided upon during a four-hour meeting on a plane trip from Seattle to Atlanta by Andy Saenz (responsible for the video card), Lew Eggebrecht (chief engineer for the PC) and himself.

The selection of graphic characters has some internal logic:

- Table rows 0 and 1, codes 0 to 31 (00_{hex} to 1F_{hex}), are assorted dingbats (complementary and decorative characters). The isolated character 127 (7F_{hex}) also belongs to this group.
- Table rows 2 to 7, codes 32 to 126 (20_{hex} to 7E_{hex}), are the standard ASCII printable characters.
- Table rows 8 to 10, codes 128 to 175 (80_{hex} to AF_{hex}), are a selection of international text characters.
- Table rows 11 to 13, codes 176 to 223 (B0_{hex} to DF_{hex}), are box drawing and block characters. This block is arranged so that characters 192 to 223 (C0_{hex} to DF_{hex}) contain all the right arms and right-filled areas. The original IBM PC MDA display adapter stored the code page 437 character glyphs as bitmaps eight pixels wide, but for visual enhancement displayed them every nine pixels on screen. This range of characters had the eighth pixel column duplicated by special hardware circuitry, thus filling in gaps in lines and filled areas. The VGA adapter allows this behaviour to be turned on or off.
- Table rows 14 and 15, codes 224 to 254 (E0_{hex} to FE_{hex}) are devoted to mathematical symbols, where the first twelve are a selection of Greek letters commonly used in physics.

Most fonts for Microsoft Windows include the special graphic characters at the Unicode indexes shown, as they are part of the WGL4 set that Microsoft encourages font designers to support. (The monospaced raster font family Terminal was an early font that replicated all code page 437 characters, at least at some resolutions.) To draw these characters directly from these code points, a Microsoft Windows font called MS Linedraw replicates all of the code page 437 characters, thus providing one way to display DOS text on a modern Windows machine as it was shown in DOS, with limitations.

Code page 1055, also known as HP symbol set 0L, is a subset which includes the box-drawing, half-blocks, black circles (the black circle replaces the bullet, which replaces the middle dot in this code page), and black square, and moves them to the upper half; the space is also included.

== Internationalization ==
Code page 437 has a series of international characters, mainly values 128 to 175 (80_{hex} to AF_{hex}). However, it only covers a few major Western European languages in full, including English, German (Note: Except ẞ which was not adopted unitl 2017 and only used in all caps text) and Swedish, (Note: It also covers some less major Western European languages—as well as some other languages—in full, including Basque, Malay, and the pre-1999 Turkmen Latin alphabet, but this was likely caused by the alphabet being built based on it, rather than the other way around.) and so lacks several characters (mostly capital letters) important to many major Western European languages:

- Spanish: Á, Í, Ó, and Ú
- French: À, Â, È, Ê, Ë, Î, Ï, Ô, Œ, œ, Ù, Û, and Ÿ
- Portuguese: Á, À, Â, Ã, ã, Ê, Í, Ó, Ô, Õ, õ, and Ú
- Catalan: À, È, Í, Ï, Ò, Ó, and Ú
- Italian: À, È, Ì, Ò, and Ù
- Icelandic: Á, Ð, ð, Í, Ó, Ú, Ý, ý, Þ, and þ
- Danish/Norwegian: Ø and ø. Character number 237 (ED_{hex}), the small phi (closed form), could be used as a surrogate even though it may not render well (furthermore, it tends to map to Unicode, or render in Unicode fonts, as the open-form phi or the closed-vertical-form phi, which are even further from the O with stroke). To compensate, the Danish/Norwegian and Icelandic code pages (865 and 861) replaced cent sign (¢) with ø and the yen sign (¥) with Ø.
- Most Greek alphabet symbols were omitted, beyond the basic math symbols. (They were included in the Greek-language code pages 737 and 869. Some of the Greek symbols that were already in code page 437 had their glyphs changed from mathematical or scientific forms to match the actual use in Greek.)

Along with the cent (¢), pound sterling (£) and yen/yuan (¥) currency symbols, it has a couple of former European currency symbols: the florin (ƒ, Netherlands) and the peseta (₧, Spain). The presence of the last is unusual, since the Spanish peseta was never an internationally relevant currency, and also never had a symbol of its own; it was simply abbreviated as "Pt", "Pta", "Pts", or "Ptas". Spanish models of the IBM electric typewriter, however, also had a single position devoted to it.

Later DOS character sets, such as code page 850 (DOS Latin-1), code page 852 (DOS Central-European) and code page 737 (DOS Greek), filled the gaps for international use with some compatibility with code page 437 by retaining the single and double box-drawing characters, while discarding the mixed ones (e.g. horizontal double/vertical single). All code page 437 characters have similar glyphs in Unicode and in Microsoft's WGL4 character set, and therefore are available in most fonts in Microsoft Windows, and also in the default VGA font of the Linux kernel, and the ISO 10646 fonts for X11.

== See also ==
- Alt code
- ANSI
- ASCII
- Semigraphical characters
- Atari ST character set, derived from code page 437
