= Apple II character set =

Set of characters used in the Apple II text mode

Apple II text mode uses the 7-bit ASCII (us-ascii) character set. The high-bit is set to display in normal mode on the 40x24 text screen.

== Character sets ==
=== Apple II / Apple II plus ===
The original Signetics 2513 character generator chip has 64 glyphs for upper case, numbers, symbols, and punctuation characters. Each 5x7 pixel bitmap matrix is displayed in a 7x8 character cell on the text screen. The 64 characters can be displayed in INVERSE in the range $00 to $3F, FLASHing in the range $40 to $7F, and NORMAL mode in the range $80 to $FF. Normal mode characters are repeated in the $80 to $FF range.

To display lowercase letters, applications can run in the graphics modes and use custom fonts, rather than running in text mode using the font in ROM.

=== Apple //e and //c (MouseText mode) ===
	0	1	2	3	4	5	6	7	8	9	A	B	C	D	E	F
0x	@	A	B	C	D	E	F	G	H	I	J	K	L	M	N	O
1x	P	Q	R	S	T	U	V	W	X	Y	Z	[	\	]	^	_
2x		!	"		$	%	&	'	(	)		+	,	-	.	/
3x	0	1	2	3	4	5	6	7	8	9			<	=	>	?
4x	(Note: Apple uses U+F8FF in the Corporate Private Use Area to display the solid Apple logo. It does not have a Unicode code point and it is usually not supported on non-Apple platforms.)						(Note: The left and right "running man" halves were replaced with different characters in the Apple IIGS version of the MouseText character set (shown below.))									
5x																
6x	`	a	b	c	d	e	f	g	h	i	j	k	l	m	n	o
7x	p	q	r	s	t	u	v	w	x	y	z	{	|	}	~	
8x	@	A	B	C	D	E	F	G	H	I	J	K	L	M	N	O
9x	P	Q	R	S	T	U	V	W	X	Y	Z	[	\	]		_
Ax	SP	!	"	#	$	%	&	'	(	)	*	+	,	-	.	/
Bx	0	1	2	3	4	5	6	7	8	9	:	;	<	=	>	?
Cx	@	A	B	C	D	E	F	G	H	I	J	K	L	M	N	O
Dx	P	Q	R	S	T	U	V	W	X	Y	Z	[	\	]		_
Ex	`	a	b	c	d	e	f	g	h	i	j	k	l	m	n	o
Fx	p	q	r	s	t	u	v	w	x	y	z	{	|	}	~	

=== Apple IIGS ===
Two characters in the Apple II MouseText character set was updated for the GS. The characters unique to MouseText are encoded in Unicode's Symbols for Legacy Computing block.

	0	1	2	3	4	5	6	7	8	9	A	B	C	D	E	F
0x	@	A	B	C	D	E	F	G	H	I	J	K	L	M	N	O
1x	P	Q	R	S	T	U	V	W	X	Y	Z	[	\	]	^	_
2x		!	"		$	%	&	'	(	)		+	,	-	.	/
3x	0	1	2	3	4	5	6	7	8	9			<	=	>	?
4x																
5x																
6x	`	a	b	c	d	e	f	g	h	i	j	k	l	m	n	o
7x	p	q	r	s	t	u	v	w	x	y	z	{	|	}	~	
8x	@	A	B	C	D	E	F	G	H	I	J	K	L	M	N	O
9x	P	Q	R	S	T	U	V	W	X	Y	Z	[	\	]		_
Ax	SP	!	"	#	$	%	&	'	(	)	*	+	,	-	.	/
Bx	0	1	2	3	4	5	6	7	8	9	:	;	<	=	>	?
Cx	@	A	B	C	D	E	F	G	H	I	J	K	L	M	N	O
Dx	P	Q	R	S	T	U	V	W	X	Y	Z	[	\	]		_
Ex	`	a	b	c	d	e	f	g	h	i	j	k	l	m	n	o
Fx	p	q	r	s	t	u	v	w	x	y	z	{	|	}	~	
