= Symbols for Legacy Computing =

- Range: U+1FB00..U+1FBFF (256 code points)
- Plane: SMP
- Scripts: Common
- Assigned: 250 code points
- Unused: 6 reserved code points

Unicode version history
- 13.0 (2020): 212 (+212)
- 16.0 (2024): 249 (+37)
- 17.0 (2025): 250 (+1)

Unicode documentation
- Code chart ∣ Web page

Symbols for Legacy Computing is a Unicode block containing graphic characters that were used for various home computers from the 1970s and 1980s and in teletext broadcasting standards. It includes characters from the Amstrad CPC, MSX, Mattel Aquarius, RISC OS, MouseText, Atari ST, TRS-80 Color Computer, Oric, Texas Instruments TI-99/4A, TRS-80, Minitel, Teletext, ATASCII, PETSCII, ZX80, and ZX81 character sets. Semigraphics characters are also included in the form of new block-shaped characters, line-drawing characters, and 60 "sextant" characters (semigraphic character made up of six smaller blocks, also known as alpha-mosaic characters). Additional characters were added to this block in Unicode 16.0 as well.

A supplemental block (Symbols for Legacy Computing Supplement) was added with Unicode 16.0.

== Block ==
Symbols for Legacy Computing^{[1]}^{[2]} Official Unicode Consortium code chart (PDF)
	0	1	2	3	4	5	6	7	8	9	A	B	C	D	E	F
U+1FB0x	🬀	🬁	🬂	🬃	🬄	🬅	🬆	🬇	🬈	🬉	🬊	🬋	🬌	🬍	🬎	🬏
U+1FB1x	🬐	🬑	🬒	🬓	🬔	🬕	🬖	🬗	🬘	🬙	🬚	🬛	🬜	🬝	🬞	🬟
U+1FB2x	🬠	🬡	🬢	🬣	🬤	🬥	🬦	🬧	🬨	🬩	🬪	🬫	🬬	🬭	🬮	🬯
U+1FB3x	🬰	🬱	🬲	🬳	🬴	🬵	🬶	🬷	🬸	🬹	🬺	🬻	🬼	🬽	🬾	🬿
U+1FB4x	🭀	🭁	🭂	🭃	🭄	🭅	🭆	🭇	🭈	🭉	🭊	🭋	🭌	🭍	🭎	🭏
U+1FB5x	🭐	🭑	🭒	🭓	🭔	🭕	🭖	🭗	🭘	🭙	🭚	🭛	🭜	🭝	🭞	🭟
U+1FB6x	🭠	🭡	🭢	🭣	🭤	🭥	🭦	🭧	🭨	🭩	🭪	🭫	🭬	🭭	🭮	🭯
U+1FB7x	🭰	🭱	🭲	🭳	🭴	🭵	🭶	🭷	🭸	🭹	🭺	🭻	🭼	🭽	🭾	🭿
U+1FB8x	🮀	🮁	🮂	🮃	🮄	🮅	🮆	🮇	🮈	🮉	🮊	🮋	🮌	🮍	🮎	🮏
U+1FB9x	🮐	🮑	🮒		🮔	🮕	🮖	🮗	🮘	🮙	🮚	🮛	🮜	🮝	🮞	🮟
U+1FBAx	🮠	🮡	🮢	🮣	🮤	🮥	🮦	🮧	🮨	🮩	🮪	🮫	🮬	🮭	🮮	🮯
U+1FBBx	🮰	🮱	🮲	🮳	🮴	🮵	🮶	🮷	🮸	🮹	🮺	🮻	🮼	🮽	🮾	🮿
U+1FBCx	🯀	🯁	🯂	🯃	🯄	🯅	🯆	🯇	🯈	🯉	🯊	🯋	🯌	🯍	🯎	🯏
U+1FBDx	🯐	🯑	🯒	🯓	🯔	🯕	🯖	🯗	🯘	🯙	🯚	🯛	🯜	🯝	🯞	🯟
U+1FBEx	🯠	🯡	🯢	🯣	🯤	🯥	🯦	🯧	🯨	🯩	🯪	🯫	🯬	🯭	🯮	🯯
U+1FBFx	🯰	🯱	🯲	🯳	🯴	🯵	🯶	🯷	🯸	🯹	🯺					
Notes: 1. As of Unicode version 17.0; 2. Grey areas indicate non-assigned code points

The image below is provided as quick reference for these symbols on systems that are unable to display them directly:

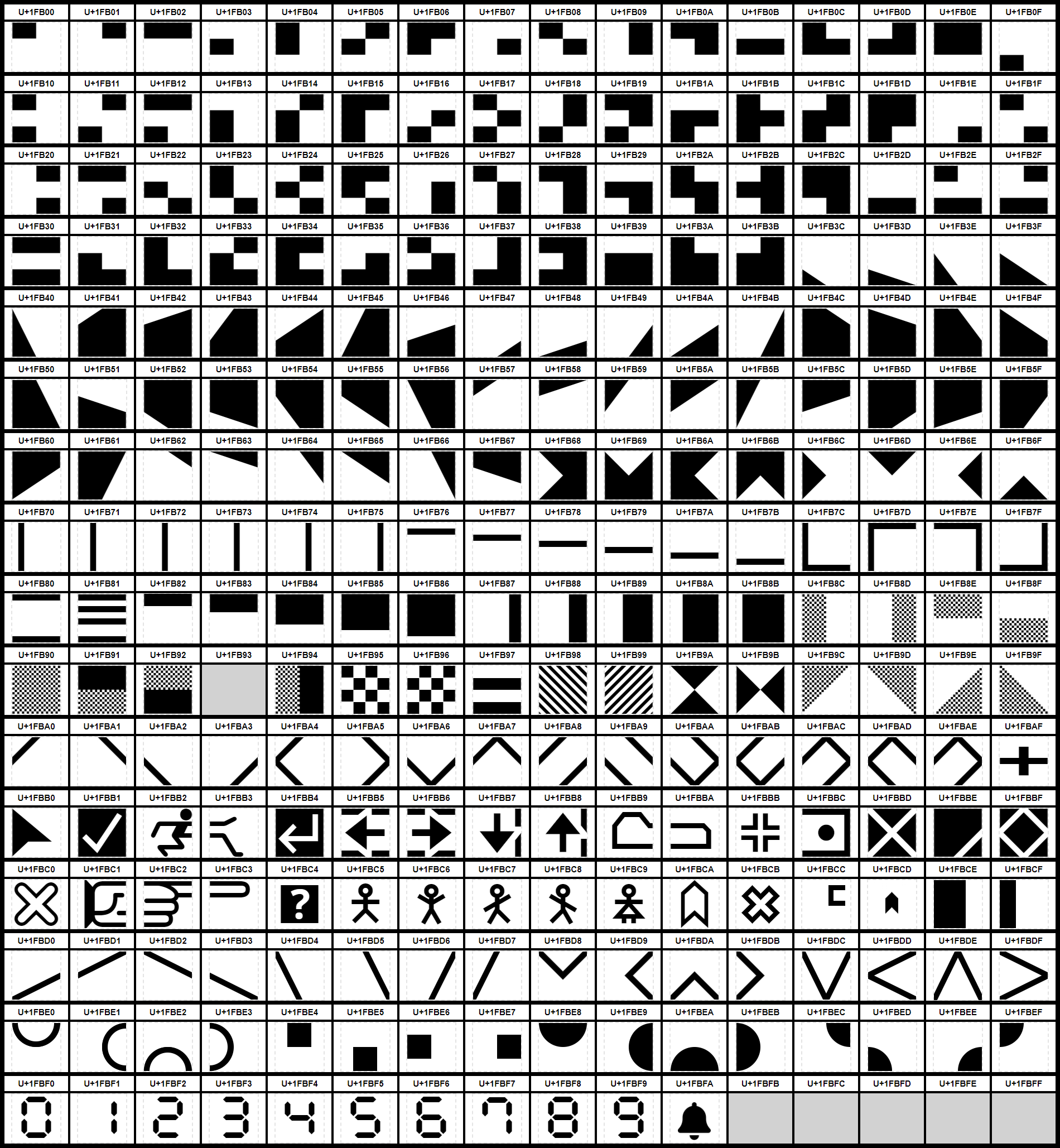

== History ==
The following Unicode-related documents record the purpose and process of defining specific characters in the Symbols for Legacy Computing block:

Version	Final code points (Note: Proposed code points and characters names may differ from final code points and names)	Count	L2 ID	WG2 ID	Document
13.0	U+1FB00..1FB92, 1FB94..1FBCA, 1FBF0..1FBF9	212	L2/17-435R		Ewell, Doug; Bettencourt, Rebecca; Everson, Michael; Silva, Eduardo Marín; Mårtenson, Elias; Shoulson, Mark; Steele, Shawn; Turner, Rebecca (2018-04-23), Proposal to add characters from legacy computers and teletext to the UCS
13.0	U+1FB00..1FB92, 1FB94..1FBCA, 1FBF0..1FBF9	212	L2/18-039		Anderson, Deborah; Whistler, Ken; Pournader, Roozbeh; Moore, Lisa; Liang, Hai; Cook, Richard (2018-01-19), "26", Recommendations to UTC #154 January 2018 on Script Proposals
13.0	U+1FB00..1FB92, 1FB94..1FBCA, 1FBF0..1FBF9	212	L2/18-235 (full, no_attach, sources, mappings_zip)		Ewell, Doug; Bettencourt, Rebecca; Bánffy, Ricardo; Everson, Michael; Silva, Eduardo Marín; Mårtenson, Elias; Shoulson, Mark; Steele, Shawn; Turner, Rebecca (2018-07-20), Proposal to add characters from legacy computers and teletext to the UCS
13.0	U+1FB00..1FB92, 1FB94..1FBCA, 1FBF0..1FBF9	212	L2/18-241		Anderson, Deborah; et al. (2018-07-20), "19", Recommendations to UTC # 156 July 2018 on Script Proposals
13.0	U+1FB00..1FB92, 1FB94..1FBCA, 1FBF0..1FBF9	212	L2/18-275R (full, no_attach, sources, mappings_zip)		Ewell, Doug; Bettencourt, Rebecca; Bánffy, Ricardo; Everson, Michael; Silva, Eduardo Marín; Mårtenson, Elias; Shoulson, Mark; Steele, Shawn; Turner, Rebecca (2018-09-06), Proposal to add characters from legacy computers and teletext to the UCS
13.0	U+1FB00..1FB92, 1FB94..1FBCA, 1FBF0..1FBF9	212	L2/18-300		Anderson, Deborah; et al. (2018-09-14), "11", Recommendations to UTC #157 on Script Proposals
13.0	U+1FB00..1FB92, 1FB94..1FBCA, 1FBF0..1FBF9	212	L2/19-025 (full, no_attach, sources, mappings_zip)	N5028	Ewell, Doug; Bettencourt, Rebecca; Bánffy, Ricardo; Everson, Michael; Silva, Eduardo Marín; Mårtenson, Elias; Shoulson, Mark; Steele, Shawn; Turner, Rebecca (2019-01-04), Proposal to add characters from legacy computers and teletext to the UCS
13.0	U+1FB00..1FB92, 1FB94..1FBCA, 1FBF0..1FBF9	212	L2/19-047		Anderson, Deborah; et al. (2019-01-13), "24", Recommendations to UTC #158 January 2019 on Script Proposals
13.0	U+1FB00..1FB92, 1FB94..1FBCA, 1FBF0..1FBF9	212	L2/19-008		Moore, Lisa (2019-02-08), "E.2", UTC #158 Minutes
13.0	U+1FB00..1FB92, 1FB94..1FBCA, 1FBF0..1FBF9	212	L2/20-015R		Moore, Lisa (2020-05-14), "B.10.17.2", Draft Minutes of UTC Meeting 162
16.0	U+1FBCB..1FBEF	37	L2/21-235 (full, no_attach, sources, mappings_zip)		Bettencourt, Rebecca; Ewell, Doug; Bánffy, Ricardo; Everson, Michael; Hietaniemi, Jarkko; Silva, Eduardo Marín; Mårtenson, Elias; Shoulson, Mark; Steele, Shawn; Turner, Rebecca (2021-12-20), Proposal to add further characters from legacy computers and teletext to the UCS
16.0	U+1FBCB..1FBEF	37	L2/22-023		Anderson, Deborah; Whistler, Ken; Pournader, Roozbeh; Constable, Peter (2022-01-22), "17 Legacy Computing Symbols", Recommendations to UTC #170 January 2022 on Script Proposals
16.0	U+1FBCB..1FBEF	37	L2/21-235R (full, no_attach)		Bettencourt, Rebecca; Ewell, Doug; Bánffy, Ricardo; Everson, Michael; Hietaniemi, Jarkko; Silva, Eduardo Marín; Mårtenson, Elias; Shoulson, Mark; Steele, Shawn; Turner, Rebecca (2022-01-26), Proposal to add further characters from legacy computers and teletext to the UCS
16.0	U+1FBCB..1FBEF	37	L2/22-016		Constable, Peter (2022-04-21), "D.1 17 Legacy Computing Symbols", UTC #170 Minutes
17.0	U+1FBFA	1	L2/23-142		Buff, Charlotte (2023-06-26), Proposal to Define Variation Sequences for Emoji Mapped to Legacy Computing Symbols
17.0	U+1FBFA	1	L2/23-157		Constable, Peter (2023-07-31), "G.3", UTC #176 Minutes
17.0	U+1FBFA	1	L2/23-252		Bettencourt, Rebecca; Ewell, Doug (2023-10-14), Proposal to disunify Symbols for Legacy Computing from emoji
17.0	U+1FBFA	1	L2/23-238R		Anderson, Deborah; Kučera, Jan; Whistler, Ken; Pournader, Roozbeh; Constable, Peter (2023-11-01), "14 Symbols", Recommendations to UTC #177 November 2023 on Script Proposals
17.0	U+1FBFA	1	L2/23-231		Constable, Peter (2023-12-08), "Consensus 177-C35", UTC #177 Minutes

== See also ==
- Box-drawing characters
- Dingbat
- other Unicode blocks
  - Box Drawing
  - Block Elements
  - Geometric Shapes
  - Halfwidth and Fullwidth Forms
  - Supplemental Arrows-C
  - Symbols for Legacy Computing Supplement
