= Wang International Standard Code for Information Interchange =

Proprietary version of ASCII

Wang International Standard Code for Information Interchange (WISCII) is an extended ASCII character encoding supporting many European languages and a few graphics symbols, used by Wang Laboratories in their personal computers and minicomputers in the 1980s. WISCII was used on the Wang PC as well as the Alliance APC, OIS, and VS systems. Wang abandoned use of this character set when they started making PC clones.

== Character set ==
WISCII
	0	1	2	3	4	5	6	7	8	9	A	B	C	D	E	F
0n																
1n																
2n	SP	!	"	#	$	%	&	'	(	)	*	+	,	-	.	/
3n	0	1	2	3	4	5	6	7	8	9	:	;	<	=	>	?
4n	@	A	B	C	D	E	F	G	H	I	J	K	L	M	N	O
5n	P	Q	R	S	T	U	V	W	X	Y	Z	[	\	]	↑	_
6n	`	a	b	c	d	e	f	g	h	i	j	k	l	m	n	o
7n	p	q	r	s	t	u	v	w	x	y	z	{	|	}	~	¢
8n	°	♦	►	◄	→	⌙	¦	■	‼	↕	↓	↑	←	±	¡	¿
9n	Â	À	Á	Ä	Ã	←	Å	↓	Æ	Ç	‡	•	Ê	È	É	Ë
An	â	à	á	ä	ã	→	å	†	æ	ç	□		ê	è	é	ë
Bn	Ǧ	Ĳ	İ	Î	Ì	Í	Ï	ĿL	Ñ	Ô	Ò	Ó	Ö	Õ	Œ	Ø
Cn	ǧ	ĳ	ı	î	ì	í	ï	ŀl	ñ	ô	ò	ó	ö	õ	œ	ø
Dn	Þ	Ð	Ý	Ş	‘	Û	Ù	Ú	Ü	©	®	℞	ª	«	§	¶
En	þ	ð	ý	ş	’	û	ù	ú	ü	™	¤	↔	º	»	ß	˙
Fn	£	ƒ	¥	¼	½	¾	ˆ	`	´	¨	˜	¸	ˇ	˘		
