= Mahjong Tiles (Unicode block) =

Unicode character block

- Range: U+1F000..U+1F02F (48 code points)
- Plane: SMP
- Scripts: Common
- Symbol sets: Mahjong tile symbols
- Assigned: 44 code points
- Unused: 4 reserved code points

Unicode version history
- 5.1 (2008): 44 (+44)

Unicode documentation
- Code chart ∣ Web page

Mahjong Tiles is a Unicode block containing characters depicting the standard set of tiles used in the game of Mahjong.

== Block ==
Mahjong Tiles^{[1]}^{[2]} Official Unicode Consortium code chart (PDF)
| | 0 | 1 | 2 | 3 | 4 | 5 | 6 | 7 | 8 | 9 | A | B | C | D | E | F |
| U+1F00x | 🀀 | 🀁 | 🀂 | 🀃 | 🀄 | 🀅 | 🀆 | 🀇 | 🀈 | 🀉 | 🀊 | 🀋 | 🀌 | 🀍 | 🀎 | 🀏 |
| U+1F01x | 🀐 | 🀑 | 🀒 | 🀓 | 🀔 | 🀕 | 🀖 | 🀗 | 🀘 | 🀙 | 🀚 | 🀛 | 🀜 | 🀝 | 🀞 | 🀟 |
| U+1F02x | 🀠 | 🀡 | 🀢 | 🀣 | 🀤 | 🀥 | 🀦 | 🀧 | 🀨 | 🀩 | 🀪 | 🀫 | | | | |
Notes: 1. As of Unicode version 17.0; 2. Grey areas indicate non-assigned code points

== Emoji ==
The Mahjong Tiles block contains one emoji: U+1F004.

It defaults to an emoji presentation and has two standardized variants defined to specify emoji-style (U+FE0F VS16) or text presentation (U+FE0E VS15).

Emoji variation sequences
| U+ | 1F004 |
| base code point | 🀄 |
| base+VS15 (text) | 🀄︎ |
| base+VS16 (emoji) | 🀄️ |

== History ==
The following Unicode-related documents record the purpose and process of defining specific characters in the Mahjong Tiles block:

| Version | Final code points (Note: Proposed code points and characters names may differ from final code points and names) | Count | L2 ID | WG2 ID | Document |
|---|---|---|---|---|---|
| 5.1 | U+1F000..1F02B | 44 | L2/05-256 | N2975 | Proposal to add Mahjong symbols to ISO/IEC 10646, 2005-08-22 |
| 5.1 | U+1F000..1F02B | 44 | | N2953 (pdf, doc) | Umamaheswaran, V. S. (2006-02-16), "7.4.12", Unconfirmed minutes of WG 2 meeting 47, Sophia Antipolis, France; 2005-09-12/15 |
| 5.1 | U+1F000..1F02B | 44 | L2/06-088 | | "7.4.12", Unconfirmed minutes of WG 2 meeting 47, 2006-02-22 |
| 5.1 | U+1F000..1F02B | 44 | | N3103 (pdf, doc) | Umamaheswaran, V. S. (2006-08-25), "M48.8.25", Unconfirmed minutes of WG 2 meeting 48, Mountain View, CA, USA; 2006-04-24/27 |
| 5.1 | U+1F000..1F02B | 44 | L2/06-306 | N3147 | Everson, Michael (2006-09-12), Proposal to encode Mahjong, Domino, and Draughts symbols in the UCS |
| 5.1 | U+1F000..1F02B | 44 | | N3162 | Proposal to add Mahjong symbols to ISO/IEC 10646, 2006-09-23 |
| 5.1 | U+1F000..1F02B | 44 | L2/07-171 | N3171 | Chen, Zhuang; Everson, Michael; Lu, Qin; Sekiguchi, Masuhiro; Shih-Shyeng, Tseng; Wei, Lin-Mei; West, Andrew (2006-09-27), Proposal to encode Mahjong, Domino, and Draughts symbols in the UCS |
| 5.1 | U+1F000..1F02B | 44 | | N3153 (pdf, doc) | Umamaheswaran, V. S. (2007-02-16), "M49.14", Unconfirmed minutes of WG 2 meeting 49 AIST, Akihabara, Tokyo, Japan; 2006-09-25/29 |
| 5.1 | U+1F000..1F02B | 44 | L2/07-268 | N3253 (pdf, doc) | Umamaheswaran, V. S. (2007-07-26), "M50.4c", Unconfirmed minutes of WG 2 meeting 50, Frankfurt-am-Main, Germany; 2007-04-24/27, "Correcting the glyphs for 4 Mahjong Tiles and annotating the name for another Tile." |
| 5.1 | U+1F000..1F02B | 44 | L2/11-438 (Note: See also L2/10-458, L2/11-414, L2/11-415, and L2/11-429) (Note: Refer to the history section of the Miscellaneous Symbols and Pictographs block for additional emoji-related documents) | N4182 | Edberg, Peter (2011-12-22), Emoji Variation Sequences (Revision of L2/11-429) |
