= Box Drawing =

- Range: U+2500..U+257F (128 code points)
- Plane: BMP
- Scripts: Common
- Assigned: 128 code points
- Unused: 0 reserved code points
- Source standards: Videotex

Unicode version history
- 1.0.0 (1991): 128 (+128)

Unicode documentation
- Code chart ∣ Web page

Box Drawing is a Unicode block containing characters for compatibility with legacy graphics standards that contained characters for making bordered charts and tables, i.e. box-drawing characters. Its block name in Unicode 1.0 was Form and Chart Components.

== Block ==
Box Drawing^{[1]} Official Unicode Consortium code chart (PDF)
	0	1	2	3	4	5	6	7	8	9	A	B	C	D	E	F
U+250x	─	━	│	┃	┄	┅	┆	┇	┈	┉	┊	┋	┌	┍	┎	┏
U+251x	┐	┑	┒	┓	└	┕	┖	┗	┘	┙	┚	┛	├	┝	┞	┟
U+252x	┠	┡	┢	┣	┤	┥	┦	┧	┨	┩	┪	┫	┬	┭	┮	┯
U+253x	┰	┱	┲	┳	┴	┵	┶	┷	┸	┹	┺	┻	┼	┽	┾	┿
U+254x	╀	╁	╂	╃	╄	╅	╆	╇	╈	╉	╊	╋	╌	╍	╎	╏
U+255x	═	║	╒	╓	╔	╕	╖	╗	╘	╙	╚	╛	╜	╝	╞	╟
U+256x	╠	╡	╢	╣	╤	╥	╦	╧	╨	╩	╪	╫	╬	╭	╮	╯
U+257x	╰	╱	╲	╳	╴	╵	╶	╷	╸	╹	╺	╻	╼	╽	╾	╿
Notes: 1. As of Unicode version 16.0

== See also ==
- Box-drawing characters
- Code page 437
- Dingbat
- Semigraphics (or pseudographics)
- other Unicode blocks
  - Block Elements
  - Geometric Shapes
  - Halfwidth and Fullwidth Forms
  - Symbols for Legacy Computing
