= Geometric Shapes (Unicode block) =

Block of Unicode symbols

- Range: U+25A0..U+25FF (96 code points)
- Plane: BMP
- Scripts: Common
- Symbol sets: Control code graphics Geometric shapes
- Assigned: 96 code points
- Unused: 0 reserved code points

Unicode Version History
- 1.0.0 (1991): 79 (+79)
- 1.1 (1993): 80 (+1)
- 3.0 (1999): 88 (+8)
- 3.2 (2002): 96 (+8)

Unicode documentation
- Code chart ∣ Web page

Geometric Shapes is a Unicode block of 96 symbols at code point range U+25A0–25FF.

== U+25A0–U+25CF ==
25A0		25B0		25C0		
Symbol	Name	Symbol	Name	Symbol	Name	Last Hex#
HTML Hex	Name	HTML Hex	Name	HTML Hex	Name	Last Hex#
Dec	Picture	Dec	Picture	Dec	Picture	Last Hex#
■	BLACK SQUARE	▰	BLACK PARALLELOGRAM	◀	BLACK LEFT-POINTING TRIANGLE	0
&#x25A0;	BLACK SQUARE	&#x25B0;	BLACK PARALLELOGRAM	&#x25C0;	BLACK LEFT-POINTING TRIANGLE	0
&#9632;		&#9648;		&#9664;		0
□	WHITE SQUARE	▱	WHITE PARALLELOGRAM	◁	WHITE LEFT-POINTING TRIANGLE (Z notation domain restriction)	1
&#x25A1;	WHITE SQUARE	&#x25B1;	WHITE PARALLELOGRAM	&#x25C1;	WHITE LEFT-POINTING TRIANGLE (Z notation domain restriction)	1
&#9633;		&#9649;		&#9665;		1
▢	WHITE SQUARE WITH ROUNDED CORNERS	▲	BLACK UP-POINTING TRIANGLE	◂	BLACK LEFT-POINTING SMALL TRIANGLE	2
&#x25A2;	WHITE SQUARE WITH ROUNDED CORNERS	&#x25B2;	BLACK UP-POINTING TRIANGLE	&#x25C2;	BLACK LEFT-POINTING SMALL TRIANGLE	2
&#9634;		&#9650;		&#9666;		2
▣	WHITE SQUARE CONTAINING BLACK SMALL SQUARE	△	WHITE UP-POINTING TRIANGLE (trine)	◃	WHITE LEFT-POINTING SMALL TRIANGLE	3
&#x25A3;	WHITE SQUARE CONTAINING BLACK SMALL SQUARE	&#x25B3;	WHITE UP-POINTING TRIANGLE (trine)	&#x25C3;	WHITE LEFT-POINTING SMALL TRIANGLE	3
&#9635;		&#9651;		&#9667;		3
▤	SQUARE WITH HORIZONTAL FILL	▴	BLACK UP-POINTING SMALL TRIANGLE	◄	BLACK LEFT-POINTING POINTER	4
&#x25A4;	SQUARE WITH HORIZONTAL FILL	&#x25B4;	BLACK UP-POINTING SMALL TRIANGLE	&#x25C4;	BLACK LEFT-POINTING POINTER	4
&#9636;		&#9652;		&#9668;		4
▥	SQUARE WITH VERTICAL FILL	▵	WHITE UP-POINTING SMALL TRIANGLE	◅	WHITE LEFT-POINTING POINTER	5
&#x25A5;	SQUARE WITH VERTICAL FILL	&#x25B5;	WHITE UP-POINTING SMALL TRIANGLE	&#x25C5;	WHITE LEFT-POINTING POINTER	5
&#9637;		&#9653;		&#9669;		5
▦	SQUARE WITH ORTHOGONAL CROSSHATCH FILL	▶	BLACK RIGHT-POINTING TRIANGLE	◆	BLACK DIAMOND	6
&#x25A6;	SQUARE WITH ORTHOGONAL CROSSHATCH FILL	&#x25B6;	BLACK RIGHT-POINTING TRIANGLE	&#x25C6;	BLACK DIAMOND	6
&#9638;		&#9654;		&#9670;		6
▧	SQUARE WITH UPPER LEFT TO LOWER RIGHT FILL	▷	WHITE RIGHT-POINTING TRIANGLE (Z notation range restriction)	◇	WHITE DIAMOND	7
&#x25A7;	SQUARE WITH UPPER LEFT TO LOWER RIGHT FILL	&#x25B7;	WHITE RIGHT-POINTING TRIANGLE (Z notation range restriction)	&#x25C7;	WHITE DIAMOND	7
&#9639;		&#9655;		&#9671;		7
▨	SQUARE WITH UPPER RIGHT TO LOWER LEFT FILL	▸	BLACK RIGHT-POINTING SMALL TRIANGLE	◈	WHITE DIAMOND CONTAINING BLACK SMALL DIAMOND	8
&#x25A8;	SQUARE WITH UPPER RIGHT TO LOWER LEFT FILL	&#x25B8;	BLACK RIGHT-POINTING SMALL TRIANGLE	&#x25C8;	WHITE DIAMOND CONTAINING BLACK SMALL DIAMOND	8
&#9640;		&#9656;		&#9672;		8
▩	SQUARE WITH DIAGONAL CROSSHATCH FILL	▹	WHITE RIGHT-POINTING SMALL TRIANGLE	◉	FISHEYE (Tainome, a Japanese bullet mark)	9
&#x25A9;	SQUARE WITH DIAGONAL CROSSHATCH FILL	&#x25B9;	WHITE RIGHT-POINTING SMALL TRIANGLE	&#x25C9;	FISHEYE (Tainome, a Japanese bullet mark)	9
&#9641;		&#9657;		&#9673;		9
▪	BLACK SMALL SQUARE	►	BLACK RIGHT-POINTING POINTER	◊	LOZENGE	A
&#x25AA;	BLACK SMALL SQUARE	&#x25BA;	BLACK RIGHT-POINTING POINTER	&#x25CA;	LOZENGE	A
&#9642;		&#9658;		&#9674;		A
▫	WHITE SMALL SQUARE	▻	WHITE RIGHT-POINTING POINTER	○	WHITE CIRCLE	B
&#x25AB;	WHITE SMALL SQUARE	&#x25BB;	WHITE RIGHT-POINTING POINTER	&#x25CB;	WHITE CIRCLE	B
&#9643;		&#9659;		&#9675;		B
▬	BLACK RECTANGLE	▼	BLACK DOWN-POINTING TRIANGLE	◌	DOTTED CIRCLE	C
&#x25AC;	BLACK RECTANGLE	&#x25BC;	BLACK DOWN-POINTING TRIANGLE	&#x25CC;	DOTTED CIRCLE	C
&#9644;		&#9660;		&#9676;		C
▭	WHITE RECTANGLE	▽	WHITE DOWN-POINTING TRIANGLE (Nabla operator)	◍	CIRCLE WITH VERTICAL FILL	D
&#x25AD;	WHITE RECTANGLE	&#x25BD;	WHITE DOWN-POINTING TRIANGLE (Nabla operator)	&#x25CD;	CIRCLE WITH VERTICAL FILL	D
&#9645;		&#9661;		&#9677;		D
▮	BLACK VERTICAL RECTANGLE	▾	BLACK DOWN-POINTING SMALL TRIANGLE	◎	BULLSEYE	E
&#x25AE;	BLACK VERTICAL RECTANGLE	&#x25BE;	BLACK DOWN-POINTING SMALL TRIANGLE	&#x25CE;	BULLSEYE	E
&#9646;		&#9662;		&#9678;		E
▯	WHITE VERTICAL RECTANGLE	▿	WHITE DOWN-POINTING SMALL TRIANGLE	●	BLACK CIRCLE	F
&#x25AF;	WHITE VERTICAL RECTANGLE	&#x25BF;	WHITE DOWN-POINTING SMALL TRIANGLE	&#x25CF;	BLACK CIRCLE	F
&#9647;		&#9663;		&#9679;		F
25A0		25B0		25C0		

The BLACK CIRCLE is displayed when typing in a password field, in order to hide characters from a screen recorder or shoulder surfing.

== Font coverage ==
Font sets like Code2000 and the DejaVu family include coverage for each of the glyphs in the Geometric Shapes range. Unifont also contains all the glyphs. Among the fonts in widespread use, full implementation is provided by Segoe UI Symbol and significant partial implementation of this range is provided by Arial Unicode MS and Lucida Sans Unicode, which include coverage for 83% (80 out of 96) and 82% (79 out of 96) of the symbols, respectively.

== Block ==
Geometric Shapes^{[1]} Official Unicode Consortium code chart (PDF)
	0	1	2	3	4	5	6	7	8	9	A	B	C	D	E	F
U+25Ax	■	□	▢	▣	▤	▥	▦	▧	▨	▩	▪	▫	▬	▭	▮	▯
U+25Bx	▰	▱	▲	△	▴	▵	▶	▷	▸	▹	►	▻	▼	▽	▾	▿
U+25Cx	◀	◁	◂	◃	◄	◅	◆	◇	◈	◉	◊	○	◌	◍	◎	●
U+25Dx	◐	◑	◒	◓	◔	◕	◖	◗	◘	◙	◚	◛	◜	◝	◞	◟
U+25Ex	◠	◡	◢	◣	◤	◥	◦	◧	◨	◩	◪	◫	◬	◭	◮	◯
U+25Fx	◰	◱	◲	◳	◴	◵	◶	◷	◸	◹	◺	◻	◼	◽	◾	◿
Notes 1.As of Unicode version 18.0

== Emoji ==
The Geometric Shapes block contains eight emoji: U+25AA–U+25AB, U+25B6, U+25C0 and U+25FB–U+25FE.

The block has sixteen standardized variants defined to specify emoji-style (U+FE0F VS16) or text presentation (U+FE0E VS15) for the eight emoji.

Emoji variation sequences
U+	25AA	25AB	25B6	25C0	25FB	25FC	25FD	25FE
default presentation	text	text	text	text	text	text	emoji	emoji
base code point	▪	▫	▶	◀	◻	◼	◽	◾
base+VS15 (text)	▪︎	▫︎	▶︎	◀︎	◻︎	◼︎	◽︎	◾︎
base+VS16 (emoji)	▪️	▫️	▶️	◀️	◻️	◼️	◽️	◾️

== History ==
The following Unicode-related documents record the purpose and process of defining specific characters in the Geometric Shapes block:

Version	Final code points (Note: Proposed code points and characters names may differ from final code points and names)	Count	L2 ID	WG2 ID	Document
1.0.0	U+25A0..25EE	79			(to be determined)
1.0.0	U+25A0..25EE	79	L2/11-438 (Note: See also L2/10-458, L2/11-414, L2/11-415, and L2/11-429) (Note: Refer to the history section of the Miscellaneous Symbols and Pictographs block for additional emoji-related documents)	N4182	Edberg, Peter (2011-12-22), Emoji Variation Sequences (Revision of L2/11-429)
1.1	U+25EF	1			(to be determined)
3.0	U+25F0..25F7	8		N1138	LaBonté, Alain (1995-01-30), Proposal to add new characters (Keyboard related) to 10646
3.0	U+25F0..25F7	8		N1203	Umamaheswaran, V. S.; Ksar, Mike (1995-05-03), "6.1.6", Unconfirmed minutes of SC2/WG2 Meeting 27, Geneva
3.0	U+25F0..25F7	8		N1303 (html, doc)	Umamaheswaran, V. S.; Ksar, Mike (1996-01-26), Minutes of Meeting 29, Tokyo
3.0	U+25F0..25F7	8	L2/97-128	N1564	Paterson, Bruce (1997-05-15), Draft pDAM for various additional characters (the "holding bucket")
3.0	U+25F0..25F7	8	L2/97-288	N1603	Umamaheswaran, V. S. (1997-10-24), "7.3", Unconfirmed Meeting Minutes, WG 2 Meeting # 33, Heraklion, Crete, Greece, 20 June – 4 July 1997
3.0	U+25F0..25F7	8	L2/98-005R	N1682	Text of ISO 10646 - AMD 22 for PDAM registration and PDAM ballot, 1997-12-17
3.0	U+25F0..25F7	8	L2/98-320	N1898	ISO/IEC 10646-1/FPDAM 22, AMENDMENT 22: Keyboard Symbols, 1998-10-22
3.0	U+25F0..25F7	8		N1897	Paterson, Bruce; Everson, Michael (1998-10-22), Disposition of Comments - FPDAM22 - Keyboard Symbols - SC2 N3191
3.0	U+25F0..25F7	8	L2/99-010	N1903 (pdf, html, doc)	Umamaheswaran, V. S. (1998-12-30), Minutes of WG 2 meeting 35, London, U.K.; 1998-09-21--25
3.0	U+25F0..25F7	8	L2/99-126		Paterson, Bruce (1999-04-14), Text for FDAM ballot ISO/IEC 10646 FDAM #22 - Keyboard symbols
3.2	U+25F8..25FE	7	L2/00-119 (Note: Refer to the history section of the Miscellaneous Mathematical Symbols-B block for additional math-related documents)	N2191R	Whistler, Ken; Freytag, Asmus (2000-04-19), Encoding Additional Mathematical Symbols in Unicode
3.2	U+25F8..25FE	7	L2/00-234	N2203 (rtf, txt)	Umamaheswaran, V. S. (2000-07-21), "8.18", Minutes from the SC2/WG2 meeting in Beijing, 2000-03-21 -- 24
3.2	U+25F8..25FE	7	L2/00-115R2		Moore, Lisa (2000-08-08), "Motion 83-M11", Minutes Of UTC Meeting #83
3.2	U+25F8..25FE	7	L2/11-438	N4182	Edberg, Peter (2011-12-22), Emoji Variation Sequences (Revision of L2/11-429)
3.2	U+25FF	1	L2/01-156	N2356	Freytag, Asmus (2001-04-03), Additional Mathematical Characters (Draft 10)
3.2	U+25FF	1	L2/01-344	N2353 (pdf, doc)	Umamaheswaran, V. S. (2001-09-09), "7.7 Mathematical Symbols", Minutes from SC2/WG2 meeting #40 -- Mountain View, April 2001

== See also ==
- Box-drawing characters
- Dingbat
- Tombstone, the end of proof character
- Other Unicode blocks
  - Box Drawing
  - Block Elements
  - Geometric Shapes Extended
  - Halfwidth and Fullwidth Forms
  - Miscellaneous Symbols and Arrows (Unicode block) includes more geometric shapes
  - Miscellaneous Symbols and Pictographs (Unicode block) includes several geometric shapes of different colors
  - Mathematical operators and symbols in Unicode
  - Symbols for Legacy Computing
