= Japanese submarine Ro-3 =

Imperial Japanese Navy Type F submarine

History

Japan
- Name: Submarine No. 31
- Builder: Kawasaki, Kobe, Japan
- Laid down: 28 October 1919
- Launched: 10 March 1921
- Completed: 15 July 1922
- Commissioned: 15 July 1922
- Renamed: Ro-3 on 1 November 1924
- Stricken: 1 April 1932

General characteristics
- Class & type: Type F submarine (F2 subclass)
- Displacement: 700 tonnes (689 long tons) surfaced; 1,064 tonnes (1,047 long tons) submerged
- Length: 65.6 m (215 ft 3 in) overall
- Beam: 6.1 m (20 ft 0 in)
- Draft: 4.1 m (13 ft 5 in)
- Installed power: 2,600 bhp (1,900 kW) (diesel); 1,200 shp (890 kW) (electric motor)
- Propulsion: Diesel-electric; 2 × Fiat diesel engines, 58.4 tons fuel; 2 × Savigliano electric motors; 2 x shafts
- Speed: 14 knots (26 km/h; 16 mph) surfaced; 8 knots (15 km/h; 9.2 mph) submerged
- Range: 3,500 nmi (6,500 km; 4,000 mi) at 10 knots (19 km/h; 12 mph) surfaced; 80 nmi (150 km; 92 mi) at 4 knots (7.4 km/h; 4.6 mph) submerged
- Test depth: 40 m (131 ft)
- Crew: 43
- Armament: As built: 5 × 450 mm (18 in) torpedo tubes (3 x bow, 2 x stern); 8 x Type 44 torpedoes; 1 x 7.7 mm machine gun; Added soon after completion: 1 × 76.2 mm (3 in)/40 deck gun

Ro-3, originally named Submarine No. 31, was an Imperial Japanese Navy Type F submarine of the F2 subclass. The Type F submarines were the first truly seagoing Japanese submarines, and the earliest to be classified as "second-class" or "medium" submarines of the Ro series. Ro-3 was commissioned in 1922 and operated in the waters of Chōsen and Japan. She was stricken in 1932.

== Design and description ==
The Type F submarines were designed by the Italian firm Fiat-Laurenti and built under license by Kawasaki at Kobe, Japan. They were the Imperial Japanese Navy′s first true seagoing submarines, and when the Japanese adopted a three-tiered classification system of its submarines as first-class (I), second-class or medium (Ro), and third-class (Ha) on 1 November 1924, the Type F submarines were the earliest to receive the second-class classification, as reflected in their low numbers in the Ro series, and in fact they were the earliest Japanese submarine classified as anything higher than third-class. They had non-cylindrical hulls intended to provide extra internal space, but the Japanese considered the hulls weak despite the provision of additional scantlings during construction to reinforce them.

The submarines of the F2 subclass displaced 700 tonnes (689 long tons) surfaced and 1,064 tonnes (1,047 long tons) submerged. The submarines were 65.6 meters (215 ft 3 in) long and had a beam of 6.1 meters (20 ft 0 in) and a draft of 4.1 meters (13 ft 5 in). They had a diving depth of 40 meters (131 ft). For surface running, the submarines were powered by two 1,300-brake-horsepower (969 kW) Fiat diesel engines, each driving one propeller shaft. When submerged each propeller was driven by a Savigliano 600-horsepower (447 kW) electric motor. They could reach 14 knots (26 km/h; 16 mph) on the surface and 8 knots (15 km/h; 9.2 mph) underwater. On the surface, they had a range of 3,500 nautical miles (6,500 km; 4,000 mi) at 10 knots (19 km/h; 12 mph); submerged, they had a range of 80 nmi (150 km; 92 mi) at 4 knots (7.4 km/h; 4.6 mph).

The submarines were armed with five 450 mm (18 in) torpedo tubes, three in the bow and two in the stern, and carried a total of eight Type 44 torpedoes. As built, they were armed with a 7.7 mm machine gun. Soon after completion, however, a 76.2 mm (3.00 in) deck gun was added.

In the F2 subclass, the Fiat diesel engines were unreliable and the F2 subclass′s top surface speed of 14 knots (26 km/h; 16 mph) was well below the expected 17 knots (31 km/h; 20 mph). Because of their disappointing performance, the Type F submarines did not serve as the basis for any later Japanese submarine classes.

== Construction and commissioning ==
Ordered in 1918, Ro-3 was laid down as Submarine No. 31 on 28 October 1918 by Kawasaki at Kobe, Japan. Launched on 10 March 1921, she was completed and commissioned on 15 July 1922.

== Service history ==
Upon commissioning, Submarine No. 31 was attached to the Sasebo Naval District and assigned to Submarine Division 23. On 1 December 1922, Submarine Division 23 was assigned to the Chinkai Defense Division on the southern coast of Chōsen. Submarine No. 31 was renamed Ro-3 on 1 November 1924.

Submarine Division 23 was reassigned to the Sasebo Defense Division in the Sasebo Naval District on 1 December 1924. On 1 June 1925, the division was assigned to the 1st Fleet, and on 1 December 1925 it returned to the Sasebo Defense Division in the Sasebo Naval District, where it remained for the rest of Ro-3′s active service.

Ro-3 was stricken from the Navy list on 1 April 1932.

== Bibliography ==
- Gray, Randal, ed., Conway′s All the World′s Fighting Ships 1906–1921, Annapolis, Maryland: Naval Institute Press, 1985, ISBN 0 87021 907 3.
