= ETEN =

ETEN or Eten may refer to:

- ETEN operation system, a Chinese OS
- European Teacher Education Network
- Eten Island, an island to the south-east of Tonowas, Micronesia
- Eten language, a Plateau language of Nigeria
- E-TEN, an electronics manufacturing company based in Taiwan
