= Type F submarine =

Imperial Japanese Navy submarine

Class overview
- Name: Type F submarines
- Builders: Kawaski, Kōbe, Japan
- Operators: Imperial Japanese Navy
- Preceded by: None
- Succeeded by: Type L submarine
- Subclasses: Type F1 (Ro-1-class); Type F2 (Ro-3-class)
- Built: 1917–1922
- In commission: 1920-1932
- Completed: 5
- Retired: 5

The Type F submarines (F型潜水艦, F-gata Sensuikan) were medium Imperial Japanese Navy submarines in commission during the 1920s. They were Japan's first true seagoing submarines and the earliest Japanese submarines classified as "second-class" or "medium" submarines.

== Design and description ==
The Type F submarines were designed by the Italian firm Fiat-Laurenti and built under license by Kawasaki at Kobe, Japan. The Type F submarines were the Imperial Japanese Navy's first true seagoing submarines, and when the Japanese adopted a three-tiered classification system of its submarines as first-class (I), second-class or medium (Ro), and third-class (Ha) on 1 November 1924, the Type F submarines were the earliest to receive the second-class classification, as reflected in their low numbers in the Ro series, and in fact they were the earliest Japanese submarine classified as anything higher than third-class.

As built, Type F submarines had no deck gun, but soon after they were completed each of them had a 76.2 mm (3 in)/40 gun installed on her deck. The Type F submarines had non-cylindrical hulls intended to provide extra internal space, but the Japanese considered the hulls weak despite the provision of additional scantlings during construction to reinforce them. Because of their disappointing performance, they did not serve as the basis for any later Japanese submarine classes.

== Class variants ==
The Type F submarines were divided into two subclasses:

- Type F1 (F1型（呂一型）, Ro-ichi-gata, Ro-1-class)
- Type F2 (F2型（呂三型）, Ro-san-gata, Ro-3-class)

=== Type F1 (Ro-1-class) ===
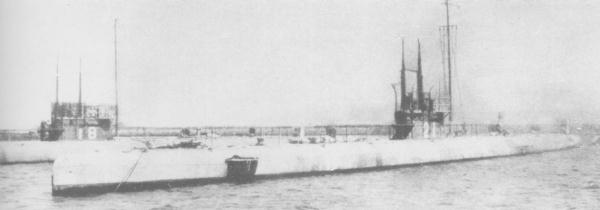
Submarine No. 18 (left background) and Submarine No. 21 (foreground) in 1920. On 1 November 1924, they were renamed Ro-1 and Ro-2, respectively.

The F1 subclass was ordered under the 1915–1916 naval program. Two were constructed between 1917 and 1920:

Name	Laid down	Launched	Completed	Notes, fate
Ro-1 ex-Submarine No. 18	5 January 1917	28 July 1919	31 March 1920	Renamed Ro-1 on 1 November 1924. Stricken 1 April 1932.
Ro-2 ex-Submarine No. 21	1 July 1918	22 November 1919	20 April 1920	Renamed Ro-2 on 1 November 1924. Stricken 1 April 1932.

=== Type F2 (Ro-3-class) ===
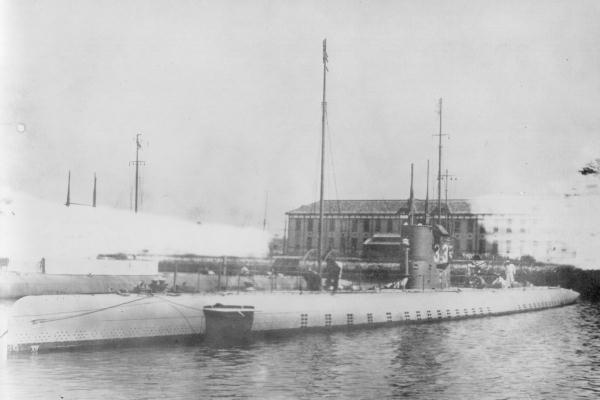
Submarine No. 33 at Sasebo, Japan, ca. 1922. She was renamed Ro-5 on 1 November 1924.

The F2 subclass (Ro-3-class) was ordered in 1918. It was an improved version of the F1 subclass with a modified bridge. The Fiat diesel engines were unreliable and the F2 subclass's top surface speed of 14 knots (26 km/h; 16 mph) was well below the intended 17 knots (31 km/h; 20 mph). Additional F2 subclass units planned under the 1919 construction program were cancelled and replaced by the new Kaichū-type and Type L submarines.

Three submarines of the F2 subclass were constructed between 1919 and 1922:

Name	Laid down	Launched	Completed	Notes, fate
Ro-3 ex-Submarine No. 31	28 October 1919	10 March 1921	15 July 1922	Renamed Ro-3 1 November 1924. Stricken 1 April 1932.
Ro-4 ex-Submarine No. 32	22 December 1919	22 June 1921	5 May 1922	Renamed Ro-4 1 November 1924. Stricken and hulked 1 April 1932.
Ro-5 ex-Submarine No. 33	1 March 1920	17 September 1921	9 March 1922	Renamed Ro-5 1 November 1924. Stricken and hulked 1 April 1932.

== Characteristics ==
Type		F1 (Ro-1)	F2 (Ro-3)
Displacement	Surfaced	689 long tons (700 t)	689 long tons (700 t)
Displacement	Submerged	1,047 long tons (1,064 t)	1,047 long tons (1,064 t)
Length (overall)		65.6 m (215 ft 3 in)	60.5 m (198 ft 6 in)
Beam		6.1 m (20 ft 0 in)	6.1 m (20 ft 0 in)
Draft		4.2 m (13 ft 9 in)	4.1 m (13 ft 5 in)
Power plant and shaft		2 × Fiat diesel engines 2 x Savigliano electric motors 2 shafts	2 × Fiat diesel engines 2 x Savigliano electric motors 2 shafts
Power	Surfaced	2,800 bhp (2,100 kW)	2,600 bhp (1,900 kW)
Power	Submerged	1,200 shp (890 kW)	1,200 shp (890 kW)
Speed	Surfaced	13 kn (24 km/h; 15 mph)	14 kn (26 km/h; 16 mph)
Speed	Submerged	8 kn (15 km/h; 9.2 mph)	8 kn (15 km/h; 9.2 mph)
Range	Surfaced	3,500 nmi (6,500 km) at 10 kn (19 km/h; 12 mph)	3,500 nmi (6,500 km) at 10 kn (19 km/h; 12 mph)
Range	Submerged	75 nmi (139 km) at 4 kn (7.4 km/h; 4.6 mph)	75 nmi (139 km) at 4 kn (7.4 km/h; 4.6 mph)
Test depth		40 m (130 ft)	40 m (130 ft)
Fuel		58.4 tons	58.4 tons
Complement		43	43
Armament		As built: • 5 × 450 mm (18 in) torpedo tubes (3 × bow, 2 × stern) • 8 × Type 44 torpedoes • 1 × 7.7 mm machine gun Added after completion: • 1 x 76.2 mm (3 in) deck gun	• 5 × 450 mm (18 in) torpedo tubes (3 × bow, 2 × stern) • 8 × Type 44 torpedoes • 1 × 7.7 mm machine gun Added after completion: • 1 x 76.2 mm (3 in) deck gun

== Bibliography ==
- Gray, Randal, ed., Conway′s All the World′s Fighting Ships 1906–1921, Annapolis, Maryland: Naval Institute Press, 1985, ISBN 0 87021 907 3.
