= Japanese submarine Ro-1 =

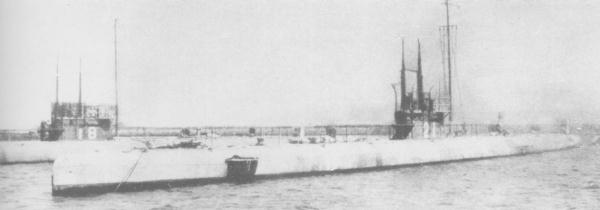
- Submarine No. 18 in 1920, visible in the left background beyond her sister ship Submarine No. 21 (foreground). On 1 November 1924, they were renamed Ro-1 and Ro-2, respectively.

History

Japan
- Name: Submarine No. 18
- Builder: Kawasaki, Kobe, Japan
- Laid down: 5 January 1917
- Launched: 28 July 1919
- Completed: 31 March 1920
- Commissioned: 31 March 1920
- Renamed: Ro-1 on 1 November 1924
- Stricken: 1 April 1932

General characteristics
- Class & type: Type F submarine (F1 subclass)
- Displacement: 700 tonnes (689 long tons) surfaced; 1,064 tonnes (1,047 long tons) submerged
- Length: 65.6 m (215 ft 3 in) overall
- Beam: 6.1 m (20 ft 0 in)
- Draft: 4.2 m (13 ft 9 in)
- Installed power: 2,800 bhp (2,100 kW) (diesel); 1,200 shp (890 kW) (electric motor)
- Propulsion: Diesel-electric; 2 × Fiat diesel engines, 58.4 tons fuel; 2 × Savigliano electric motors; 2 x shafts
- Speed: 13 knots (24 km/h; 15 mph) surfaced; 8 knots (15 km/h; 9.2 mph) submerged
- Range: 3,500 nmi (6,500 km; 4,000 mi) at 10 knots (19 km/h; 12 mph) surfaced; 80 nmi (150 km; 92 mi) at 4 knots (7.4 km/h; 4.6 mph) submerged
- Test depth: 40 m (131 ft)
- Crew: 43
- Armament: As built: 5 × 450 mm (18 in) torpedo tubes (3 x bow, 2 x stern); 8 x Type 44 torpedoes; 1 x 7.7 mm machine gun; Added soon after completion: 1 × 76.2 mm (3 in)/40 deck gun

Ro-1, originally named Submarine No. 18, was an Imperial Japanese Navy Type F submarine of the F1 subclass. She and her sister ship Ro-2 were the first truly seagoing Japanese submarines, and the earliest to be classified as "second-class" or "medium" submarines of the Ro series. She was commissioned in 1920 and operated in the waters of Japan. She was stricken in 1932.

== Design and description ==
The Type F submarines were designed by the Italian firm Fiat-Laurenti and built under license by Kawasaki at Kobe, Japan. They were the Imperial Japanese Navy′s first true seagoing submarines. When the Japanese adopted a three-tiered classification system of its submarines as first-class (I), second-class or medium (Ro), and third-class (Ha) on 1 November 1924, the Type F submarines were the earliest to receive the second-class classification, as reflected in their low numbers in the Ro series. In fact they were the earliest Japanese submarine classified as anything higher than third-class. They had non-cylindrical hulls intended to provide extra internal space, but the Japanese considered the hulls weak despite the provision of additional scantlings during construction to reinforce them. Because of their disappointing performance, they did not serve as the basis for any later Japanese submarine classes.

The submarines of the F1 subclass displaced 700 tonnes (689 long tons) surfaced and 1,064 tonnes (1,047 long tons) submerged. The submarines were 65.6 meters (215 ft 3 in) long and had a beam of 6.1 meters (20 ft 0 in) and a draft of 4.2 meters (13 ft 9 in). They had a diving depth of 40 meters (131 ft). For surface running, the submarines were powered by two 1,400-brake-horsepower (1,044 kW) Fiat diesel engines, each driving one propeller shaft. When submerged each propeller was driven by a Savigliano 600-horsepower (447 kW) electric motor. They could reach 13 knots (24 km/h; 15 mph) on the surface and 8 knots (15 km/h; 9.2 mph) underwater. On the surface, they had a range of 3,500 nautical miles (6,500 km; 4,000 mi) at 10 knots (19 km/h; 12 mph); submerged, they had a range of 80 nmi (150 km; 92 mi) at 4 knots (7.4 km/h; 4.6 mph).

The submarines were armed with five 450 mm (18 in) torpedo tubes, three in the bow and two in the stern, and carried a total of eight Type 44 torpedoes. As built, they were armed with a 7.7 mm machine gun. Soon after completion, however, a 76.2 mm (3.00 in) deck gun was added.

== Construction and commissioning ==
Ordered under the Japanese 1915–1916 naval program, Ro-1 was laid down as Submarine No. 18 on 5 January 1917 by Kawasaki at Kobe, Japan. Launched on 28 July 1919, she was completed and commissioned on 31 March 1920.

== Service history ==
Upon commissioning, Submarine No. 18 was attached to the Kure Naval District. On 20 April 1920, she was assigned to Submarine Division 14 in Submarine Squadron 1 in the 1st Fleet. On 1 December 1920, she was reassigned to Submarine Division 21 in the Sasebo Defense Division in the Sasebo Naval District, and she spent the remainder of her career serving in this capacity. She was renamed Ro-1 on 1 November 1924.

Ro-1 was stricken from the Navy list on 1 April 1932.

== Bibliography ==
- Gray, Randal, ed., Conway′s All the World′s Fighting Ships 1906–1921, Annapolis, Maryland: Naval Institute Press, 1985, ISBN 0 87021 907 3.
