= Ro-1 =

Ro-1 may refer to:

- Japanese submarine Ro-1, an Imperial Japanese Navy submarine commissioned in 1920 and stricken in 1932
- Romeo Ro.1, an Italian license-built version of the Fokker C.V aircraft
- Type F submarine, an Imperial Japanese Navy submarine class whose F1 subclass sometimes is called the Ro-1 class
