= Ro-5 =

Ro-5 may refer to:

- IMAM Ro.5, an Italian sport aircraft of 1929
- Japanese submarine Ro-5, an Imperial Japanese Navy submarine commissioned in 1922 and stricken in 1932
