= Big5 =

Encoding for Traditional Chinese characters

- MIME / IANA: Big5
- Alias(es): Big-5, 大五碼
- Languages: Traditional Chinese, English; Partial support: Simplified Chinese, Greek, Japanese, Russian, Bulgarian, some of IPA letters for phonetic usage.
- Created by: Institute for Information Industry
- Classification: Extended ASCII, (Note: Not in the strictest sense of the term, as ASCII bytes can appear as trail bytes.) (Note: Big5 does not specify a single-byte component; however, ASCII (or an extension) is used in practice.) variable-width encoding, DBCS, CJK encoding
- Extends: ASCII
- Extensions: Windows-950, Big5-HKSCS, numerous others
- Other related encoding: CNS 11643

Big-5 or Big5 (Chinese: 大五碼) is a Chinese character encoding method used in Taiwan, Hong Kong, and Macau for traditional Chinese characters.

The People's Republic of China (PRC), which uses simplified Chinese characters, uses the GB 18030 character set instead (though it can also substitute Big-5 or UTF-8).

Big5 gets its name from the consortium of five companies in Taiwan that developed it.

== Encoding ==
The original Big5 character set is sorted first by usage frequency, second by stroke count, lastly by Kangxi radical.

The original Big5 character set lacked many commonly used characters. To solve this problem, each vendor developed its own extension. The ETen extension became part of the current Big5 standard through popularity.

The structure of Big5 does not conform to the ISO 2022 standard, but rather bears a certain similarity to the Shift JIS encoding. It is a double-byte character set (DBCS) with the following structure:

First byte ("lead byte")	0x81 to 0xfe (or 0xa1 to 0xf9 for non-user-defined characters)
Second byte	0x40 to 0x7e, 0xa1 to 0xfe

(the prefix 0x signifying hexadecimal numbers).

Standard assignments (excluding vendor or user-defined extensions) do not use the bytes 0x7F through 0xA0, nor 0xFF, as either lead (first) or trail (second) bytes. Bytes 0xA1 through 0xFE are used for both lead and trail bytes for double-byte (Big5) codes. Bytes 0x40 through 0x7E are used as trail bytes following a lead byte, or for single-byte codes otherwise. If the second byte is not in either range, behavior is unspecified (i.e., varies from system to system). Additionally, certain variants of the Big5 character set, for example the HKSCS, use an expanded range for the lead byte, including values in the 0x81 to 0xA0 range (similar to Shift JIS), whereas others use reduced lead byte ranges (for instance, the Apple Macintosh variant uses 0xFD through 0xFF as single-byte codes, limiting the lead byte range to 0xA1 through 0xFC).

The numerical value of individual Big5 codes are frequently given as a 4-digit hexadecimal number, which describes the two bytes that comprise the Big5 code as if the two bytes were a big endian representation of a 16-bit number. For example, the Big5 code for a full-width space, which are the bytes 0xa1 0x40, is usually written as 0xa140 or just A140.

Strictly speaking, the Big5 encoding contains only DBCS characters. However, in practice, the Big5 codes are always used together with an unspecified, system-dependent single-byte character set (SBCS) (such as ASCII or code page 437), so that Big5-encoded text contains a mix of double-byte characters and single-byte characters. Bytes in the range 0x00 to 0x7f that are not part of a double-byte character are assumed to be single-byte characters. (For a more detailed description of this problem, please see the discussion on "The Matching SBCS" below.)

The meaning of non-ASCII single bytes outside the permitted values that are not part of a double-byte character varies from system to system. In old MSDOS-based systems, they are likely to be displayed as 8-bit characters; in modern systems, they are likely to either give unpredictable results or generate an error.

=== A more detailed look at the organization ===
In the original Big5, the encoding is compartmentalized into different zones:

0x8140 to 0xA0FE	Reserved for user-defined characters 造字
0xA140 to 0xA3BF	"Graphical characters" 圖形碼
0xA3C0 to 0xA3E0	Control characters 傳輸控制碼
0xA3E1 to 0xA3FE	Reserved, not for user-defined characters
0xA440 to 0xC67E	Frequently used characters 常用字
0xC6A1 to 0xC8FE	Reserved for user-defined characters
0xC940 to 0xF9D5	Less frequently used characters 次常用字
0xF9D6 to 0xFEFE	Reserved for user-defined characters

The "graphical characters" actually comprise punctuation marks, partial punctuation marks (e.g., half of a dash, half of an ellipsis; see below), dingbats, foreign characters, and other special characters (e.g., presentational "full width" forms, digits for Suzhou numerals, zhuyin fuhao, etc.)

In most vendor extensions, extended characters are placed in the various zones reserved for user-defined characters, each of which are normally regarded as associated with the preceding zone. For example, additional "graphical characters" (e.g., punctuation marks) would be expected to be placed in the 0xa3c0–0xa3fe range, and additional logograms would be placed in either the 0xc6a1–0xc8fe or the 0xf9d6–0xfefe range. Sometimes, this is not possible due to the large number of extended characters to be added; for example, Cyrillic letters and Japanese kana have been placed in the zone associated with "frequently-used characters".

=== Duplicates ===
Big5 has encoded two duplicate characters: "兀" on 0xA461 (U+5140) and 0xC94A (U+FA0C), "嗀" on 0xDCD1 (U+55C0) and 0xDDFC (U+FA0D).

Some encoding mapping also maps the three Suzhou numerals, "〸", "〹" and "〺", in the graphical section to ideograph characters (U+5341, U+5344 and U+5345 respectively) instead of CJK Symbols and Punctuation (U+3038, U+3039 and U+303A respectively).

=== What a Big5 code actually encodes ===
An individual Big5 code does not always represent a complete semantic unit. The Big5 codes of logograms are always logograms, but codes in the "graphical characters" section are not always complete "graphical characters". What Big5 encodes are particular graphical representations of characters or part of characters that happen to fit in the space taken by two monospaced ASCII characters. This is a property of CJK double-byte character sets, and is not a unique problem of Big5.

(The above might need some explanation by putting it in historical perspective, as it is theoretically incorrect: Back when text mode personal computing was still the norm, characters were normally represented as single bytes and each character takes one position on the screen. There was therefore a practical reason to insist that double-byte characters must take up two positions on the screen, namely that off-the-shelf, American-made software would then be usable without modification in a DBCS-based system. If a character can take an arbitrary number of screen positions, software that assumes that one byte of text takes one screen position would produce incorrect output. Of course, if a computer never had to deal with the text screen, the manufacturer would not enforce this artificial restriction; the Apple Macintosh is an example. Nevertheless, the encoding itself must be designed so that it works correctly on text-screen-based systems.)

To illustrate this point, consider the Big5 code 0xa14b (…). To English speakers this looks like an ellipsis and the Unicode standard identifies it as such; however, in Chinese, the ellipsis consists of six dots that fit in the space of two Chinese characters (……), so in fact there is no Big5 code for the Chinese ellipsis, and the Big5 code 0xa14b just represents half of a Chinese ellipsis. It represents only half of an ellipsis because the whole ellipsis should take the space of two Chinese characters, and in many DBCS systems one DBCS character must take exactly the space of one Chinese character.

Characters encoded in Big5 do not always represent things that can be readily used in plain text files; an example is "citation mark" (0xa1ca, ﹋), which is, when used, required to be typeset under the title of literary works. Another example is the Suzhou numerals, which is a form of scientific notation that requires the number to be laid out in a 2-D form consisting of at least two rows.

=== The Matching SBCS ===
In practice, Big5 cannot be used without a matching SBCS; this is mostly to do with a compatibility reason. However, as in the case of other CJK DBCS character sets, the SBCS to use has never been specified. Big5 has always been defined as a DBCS, though when used it must be paired with a suitable, unspecified SBCS and therefore used as what some people call a MBCS; nevertheless, Big5 by itself, as defined, is strictly a DBCS.

The SBCS to use being unspecified implies that the SBCS used can theoretically vary from system to system. Nowadays, ASCII is the only possible SBCS one would use. However, in old DOS-based systems, code page 437—with its extra special symbols in the control code area including position 127—was much more common. Yet, on a Macintosh system with the Chinese Language Kit, or on a Unix system running the cxterm terminal emulator, the SBCS paired with Big5 would not be code page 437.

Outside the valid range of Big5, the old DOS-based systems would routinely interpret things according to the SBCS that is paired with Big5 on that system. In such systems, characters 127 to 160, for example, were very likely not avoided because they would produce invalid Big5, but used because they would be valid characters in code page 437.

The modern characterization of Big5 as an MBCS consisting of the DBCS of Big5 plus the SBCS of ASCII is therefore historically incorrect and potentially flawed, as the choice of the matching SBCS was, and theoretically still is, quite independent of the flavour of Big5 being used.

== History ==
The inability of ASCII to support large Chinese, Japanese and Korean (CJK) character sets led to governments and industry to find creative solutions to enable their languages to be rendered on computers. A variety of ad hoc and usually proprietary input methods led to efforts to develop a standard system. As a result, Big5 encoding was defined by the Institute for Information Industry of Taiwan in 1984.

The name "Big5" is in recognition that the standard emerged from collaboration of five of Taiwan's largest IT firms:

- Acer (宏碁)
- MiTAC (神通)
- JiaJia (佳佳)
- ZERO ONE Technology (零壹 or 01tech)
- First International Computer (FIC) (大眾)

Big5 was rapidly popularized in Taiwan and worldwide among Chinese who used the traditional Chinese character set through its adoption in several commercial software packages, notably the E-TEN Chinese DOS input system (ETen Chinese System). The Republic of China government declared Big5 as their standard in mid-1980s since it was, by then, the de facto standard for using traditional Chinese on computers.

== Extensions ==
The original Big-5 only include CJK logograms from the Charts of Standard Forms of Common National Characters (4808 characters) and Less-Than-Common National Characters (6343 characters), but not letters from people's names, place names, dialects, chemistry, biology, and Japanese kana. As a result, many Big-5 supporting programs include extensions to address the problems.

The plethora of variations make UTF-8 (or UTF-16 or the Chinese GB 18030 standard, which is also a full Unicode Transformation Format, i.e. not only for simplified Chinese) a more consistent code page for modern use.

=== Vendor extensions ===
==== ETen extensions ====
In the ETen (倚天) Chinese operating system, the following code points are added, to add support for some characters present in the IBM 5550's code page but absent from generic Big5:

- 0xC6A1–0xC875: circle 1–10, bracket 1–10, Roman numerals 1–9 (i–ix), CJK radical glyphs, Japanese hiragana, Japanese katakana, Cyrillic characters
- 0xC876–0xC8D3: CJK components, additional symbols and symbols for 40-key Array Input method.
- 0xF9D6–0xF9FE: the characters '碁', '銹', '恒', '裏', '墻', '粧' and '嫺', followed by 34 additional box-drawing characters symbols.

	+0	+1	+2	+3	+4	+5	+6	+7	+8	+9	+A	+B	+C	+D	+E	+F
C6A0		①	②	③	④	⑤	⑥	⑦	⑧	⑨	⑩	⑴	⑵	⑶	⑷	⑸
C6B0	⑹	⑺	⑻	⑼	⑽	ⅰ	ⅱ	ⅲ	ⅳ	ⅴ	ⅵ	ⅶ	ⅷ	ⅸ	ⅹ	⼂
C6C0	⼃	⼅	⼇	⼌	⼍	⼎	⼓	⼖	⼙	⼛	⼢	⼧	⼮	⼳	⼴	⼵
C6D0	⼹	⼺	⽁	⽆	⽧	⽨	⾡	⾪	¨	ˆ	ヽ	ヾ	ゝ	ゞ	〃	仝
C6E0	々	〆	〇	ー	［	］	✽	ぁ	あ	ぃ	い	ぅ	う	ぇ	え	ぉ
C6F0	お	か	が	き	ぎ	く	ぐ	け	げ	こ	ご	さ	ざ	し	じ	
C740	す	ず	せ	ぜ	そ	ぞ	た	だ	ち	ぢ	っ	つ	づ	て	で	と
C750	ど	な	に	ぬ	ね	の	は	ば	ぱ	ひ	び	ぴ	ふ	ぶ	ぷ	へ
C760	べ	ぺ	ほ	ぼ	ぽ	ま	み	む	め	も	ゃ	や	ゅ	ゆ	ょ	よ
C770	ら	り	る	れ	ろ	ゎ	わ	ゐ	ゑ	を	ん	ァ	ア	ィ	イ	
C7A0		ゥ	ウ	ェ	エ	ォ	オ	カ	ガ	キ	ギ	ク	グ	ケ	ゲ	コ
C7B0	ゴ	サ	ザ	シ	ジ	ス	ズ	セ	ゼ	ソ	ゾ	タ	ダ	チ	ヂ	ッ
C7C0	ツ	ヅ	テ	デ	ト	ド	ナ	ニ	ヌ	ネ	ノ	ハ	バ	パ	ヒ	ビ
C7D0	ピ	フ	ブ	プ	ヘ	ベ	ペ	ホ	ボ	ポ	マ	ミ	ム	メ	モ	ャ
C7E0	ヤ	ュ	ユ	ョ	ヨ	ラ	リ	ル	レ	ロ	ヮ	ワ	ヰ	ヱ	ヲ	ン
C7F0	ヴ	ヵ	ヶ	А	Б	В	Г	Д	Е	Ё	Ж	З	И	Й	К	
C840	Л	М	Н	О	П	Р	С	Т	У	Ф	Х	Ц	Ч	Ш	Щ	Ъ
C850	Ы	Ь	Э	Ю	Я	а	б	в	г	д	е	ё	ж	з	и	й
C860	к	л	м	н	о	п	р	с	т	у	ф	х	ц	ч	ш	щ
C870	ъ	ы	ь	э	ю	я	⇧	↸	↹	㇏	𠃌	乚	𠂊	刂	䒑	
C8A0		龰	冈	龱	𧘇	1-	5_{8}	3^{9}_{8}	3-	3^{2}_{1}	4-	5-	6-	8_{1}	7-	8-
C8B0	9-	7^{0}_{8}	6^{0}_{7}	9^{2}_{1}	0_{1}	1^{2}_{1}	4_{1}	2-	5^{2}_{1}	7_{1}	4^{9}_{8}	2^{2}_{1}	2^{9}_{8}	6^{2}_{1}	1^{0}_{8}	1^{6}_{3}
C8C0	2^{5}_{3}	3^{6}_{3}	4^{6}_{3}	5^{6}_{3}	6^{6}_{3}	7^{6}_{3}	8_{6}	9^{6}_{5}	0^{6}_{3}	8_{8}	9^{9}_{8}	0_{8}	0-	￢	￤	＇
C8D0	＂	㈱	№	℡												
F9D0							碁	銹	裏	墻	恒	粧	嫺	╔	╦	╗
F9E0	╠	╬	╣	╚	╩	╝	╒	╤	╕	╞	╪	╡	╘	╧	╛	╓
F9F0	╥	╖	╟	╫	╢	╙	╨	╜	║	═	╭	╮	╰	╯	▓	

This extension is commonly known as Big5-ETen extension. In some later versions of ETen, there are extra graphical symbols and simplified Chinese characters.

==== Microsoft code pages ====
Microsoft created its own version of Big5 extension as code page 950 for use with Microsoft Windows, which supports the 0xF9D6–0xF9FE code points from ETEN's extensions. In some versions of Windows, the euro currency symbol is mapped to Big-5 code point A3E1.

After installing Microsoft's HKSCS patch on top of traditional Chinese Windows (or any version of Windows 2000 and above with proper language pack), applications using code page 950 automatically use a hidden code page 951 table. The table supports all code points in HKSCS-2001, except for the compatibility code points specified by the standard.

==== IBM code pages ====
In contrast to Microsoft's code page 950, IBM's CCSID 950 comprises single byte code page 1114 (CCSID 1114) and double byte code page 947 (CCSID 947). It incorporates ETEN extensions for lead bytes 0xA3, 0xC6, 0xC7 and 0xC8, while omitting those with lead byte 0xF9 (which Microsoft includes), mapping them instead to the Private Use Area as user-defined characters. It also includes two non-ETEN extension regions with trail bytes 0x81–A0, i.e. outside the usual Big5 trail byte range but similar to the Big5+ trail byte range: area 5 has lead bytes 0xF2–F9 and contains IBM-selected characters, while area 9 has lead bytes 0x81–8C and is a user-defined region.

IBM refers to the euro sign update of their Big-5 variant as CCSID 1370, which includes both single-byte (0x80) and double-byte (0xA3E1) euro signs. It comprises single byte code page 1114 (CCSID 5210) and double byte code page 947 (CCSID 21427). For better compatibility with Microsoft's variant in IBM Db2, IBM also define the pure double-byte code page 1372 and the associated variable-width CCSID 1373, which corresponds to Microsoft's code page 950.

IBM assigns CCSID 5471 to the HKSCS-2001 Big5 code page (with CPGID 1374 as CCSID 5470 as the double byte component), CCSID 9567 to the HKSCS-2004 code page (with CPGID 1374 as CCSID 9566 as the double byte component), and CCSID 13663 to the HKSCS-2008 code page (with CPGID 1374 as CCSID 13662 as the double byte component), while CCSID 1375 is assigned to a growing HKSCS code page, currently equivalent to CCSID 13663.

==== ChinaSea font ====
ChinaSea fonts (中國海字集) are Traditional Chinese fonts made by ChinaSea. The fonts are rarely sold separately, but are bundled with other products, such as the Chinese version of Microsoft Office 97. The fonts support Japanese kana, kokuji, and other characters missing in Big-5. As a result, the ChinaSea extensions have become more popular than the government-supported extensions. Some Hong Kong BBSes had used encodings in ChinaSea fonts before the introduction of HKSCS.

==== 'Sakura' font ====
The 'Sakura' font (日和字集 Sakura Version) is developed in Hong Kong and is designed to be compatible with HKSCS. It adds support for kokuji and proprietary dingbats (including Doraemon) not found in HKSCS.

==== Unicode-at-on ====
Unicode-at-on (Unicode補完計畫), formerly BIG5 extension, extends BIG-5 by altering code page tables, but uses the ChinaSea extensions starting with version 2. However, with the bankruptcy of ChinaSea, late development, and the increasing popularity of HKSCS and Unicode (the project is not compatible with HKSCS), the success of this extension is limited at best.

Despite the problems, characters previously mapped to Unicode Private Use Area are remapped to the standardized equivalents when exporting characters to Unicode format.

==== OPG ====
The web sites of the Oriental Daily News and Sun Daily, belonging to the Oriental Press Group Limited (東方報業集團有限公司) in Hong Kong, used a downloadable font with a different Big-5 extension coding than the HKSCS.

=== Official extensions ===
==== Taiwan Ministry of Education font ====
The Taiwan Ministry of Education supplied its own font, the Taiwan Ministry of Education font (臺灣教育部造字檔) for use internally.

==== Taiwan Council of Agriculture font ====
Executive Yuan introduced a 133-character custom font, the Taiwan Council of Agriculture font (臺灣農委會常用中文外字集), that includes 84 characters from the fish radical and 7 from the bird radical.

==== Big5+ ====
The Chinese Foundation for Digitization Technology (中文數位化技術推廣委員會) introduced Big5+ in 1997, which used over 20000 code points to incorporate all CJK logograms in Unicode 1.1. However, the extra code points exceeded the original Big-5 definition (Big5+ uses high byte values 81-FE and low byte values 40-7E and 80-FE), preventing it from being installed on Microsoft Windows without new codepage files.

==== Big-5E ====
To allow Windows users to use custom fonts, the Chinese Foundation for Digitization Technology introduced Big-5E, which added 3954 characters (in three blocks of code points: 8E40-A0FE, 8140-86DF, 86E0-875C) and removed the Japanese kana from the ETEN extension. Unlike Big-5+, Big5E extends Big-5 within its original definition. Mac OS X 10.3 and later supports Big-5E in the fonts LiHei Pro (儷黑 Pro.ttf) and LiSong Pro (儷宋 Pro.ttf).

==== Big5-2003 ====
The Chinese Foundation for Digitization Technology made a Big5 definition and put it into CNS 11643 in note form, making it part of the official standard in Taiwan.

Big5-2003 incorporates all Big-5 characters introduced in the 1984 ETEN extensions (code points A3C0-A3E0, C6A1-C7F2, and F9D6-F9FE) and the Euro symbol. Cyrillic characters were not included because the authority claimed CNS 11643 does not include such characters.

==== CDP ====
The Academia Sinica made a Chinese Data Processing font (漢字構形資料庫) in late 1990s, which the latest release version 2.5 included 112,533 characters, some less than the Mojikyo fonts.

==== HKSCS ====
Hong Kong also adopted Big5 for character encoding. However, written Cantonese has its own characters not available in the normal Big5 character set. To solve this problem, the Hong Kong Government created the Big5 extensions Government Chinese Character Set (GCCS) in 1995 and Hong Kong Supplementary Character Set in 1999. The Hong Kong extensions were commonly distributed as a patch. It is still being distributed as a patch by Microsoft, but a full Unicode font is also available from the Hong Kong Government's web site.

There are two encoding schemes of HKSCS: one encoding scheme is for the Big-5 coding standard and the other is for the ISO 10646 standard. Subsequent to the initial release, there are also HKSCS-2001 and HKSCS-2004. The HKSCS-2004 is aligned technically with the ISO/IEC 10646:2003 and its Amendment 1 published in April 2004 by the International Organization for Standardization (ISO).

HKSCS includes all the characters from the common ETen extension, plus some characters from simplified Chinese, place names, people's names, and Cantonese phrases (including profanity).

As of 2020, the most recent edition of HKSCS is HKSCS-2016; however, the last edition of HKSCS to encode all of its characters in Big5 was HKSCS-2008, while the characters added in more recent editions are mapped to ISO 10646 / Unicode only (as a CJK Unified Ideographs horizontal glyph extension where appropriate). Additionally, similarly to Hong Kong's situation, there are also characters that are needed by Macao but is neither included in Big5 nor HKSCS, hence, the Macao Supplementary Character Set was developed, comprising characters not found in Big5 or HKSCS; this, however, is also not encoded in Big5. The first batch of 121 MSCS characters were submitted for inclusion in or mapping to Unicode in 2009, and the first final version of MSCS was established in 2020.

== Kana and Cyrillic ==
There are two major Big5 extension layouts for encoding kana, Russian Cyrillic and list markers in the range 0xC6A1 through 0xC875. These are not compatible with one another. They are compared in the table below.

The ETEN layout of kana and Cyrillic is also used by the HKSCS (including HTML5) and Unicode-At-On variants, as well as by IBM's version of code page 950, and the ETEN layout of the kana (with Cyrillic omitted) is also used by the Big5-2003 variant. The published mapping files for Windows-950 include neither, and this Big5 range is mapped to the Private Use Area by the Windows-950 implementation from International Components for Unicode. Python's built-in cp950 codec implementation is using the BIG5.TXT layout. The classic Mac OS version includes neither layout.

Big5 codes 0xC6A1 through 0xC875

Big5 code	BIG5.TXT layout	ETEN layout
0xC6A1	ヾ	①
0xC6A2	ゝ	②
0xC6A3	ゞ	③
0xC6A4	々	④
0xC6A5	ぁ	⑤
0xC6A6	あ	⑥
0xC6A7	ぃ	⑦
0xC6A8	い	⑧
0xC6A9	ぅ	⑨
0xC6AA	う	⑩
0xC6AB	ぇ	⑴
0xC6AC	え	⑵
0xC6AD	ぉ	⑶
0xC6AE	お	⑷
0xC6AF	か	⑸
0xC6B0	が	⑹
0xC6B1	き	⑺
0xC6B2	ぎ	⑻
0xC6B3	く	⑼
0xC6B4	ぐ	⑽
0xC6B5	け	ⅰ
0xC6B6	げ	ⅱ
0xC6B7	こ	ⅲ
0xC6B8	ご	ⅳ
0xC6B9	さ	ⅴ
0xC6BA	ざ	ⅵ
0xC6BB	し	ⅶ
0xC6BC	じ	ⅷ
0xC6BD	す	ⅸ
0xC6BE	ず	ⅹ
0xC6BF	せ	丶
0xC6C0	ぜ	丿
0xC6C1	そ	亅
0xC6C2	ぞ	亠
0xC6C3	た	冂
0xC6C4	だ	冖
0xC6C5	ち	冫
0xC6C6	ぢ	勹
0xC6C7	っ	匸
0xC6C8	つ	卩
0xC6C9	づ	厶
0xC6CA	て	夊
0xC6CB	で	宀
0xC6CC	と	巛
0xC6CD	ど	⼳
0xC6CE	な	广
0xC6CF	に	廴
0xC6D0	ぬ	彐
0xC6D1	ね	彡
0xC6D2	の	攴
0xC6D3	は	无
0xC6D4	ば	疒
0xC6D5	ぱ	癶
0xC6D6	ひ	辵
0xC6D7	び	隶
0xC6D8	ぴ	¨
0xC6D9	ふ	ˆ
0xC6DA	ぶ	ヽ
0xC6DB	ぷ	ヾ
0xC6DC	へ	ゝ
0xC6DD	べ	ゞ
0xC6DE	ぺ	〃
0xC6DF	ほ	仝
0xC6E0	ぼ	々
0xC6E1	ぽ	〆
0xC6E2	ま	〇
0xC6E3	み	ー
0xC6E4	む	［
0xC6E5	め	］
0xC6E6	も	✽
0xC6E7	ゃ	ぁ
0xC6E8	や	あ
0xC6E9	ゅ	ぃ
0xC6EA	ゆ	い
0xC6EB	ょ	ぅ
0xC6EC	よ	う
0xC6ED	ら	ぇ
0xC6EE	り	え
0xC6EF	る	ぉ
0xC6F0	れ	お
0xC6F1	ろ	か
0xC6F2	ゎ	が
0xC6F3	わ	き
0xC6F4	ゐ	ぎ
0xC6F5	ゑ	く
0xC6F6	を	ぐ
0xC6F7	ん	け
0xC6F8	ァ	げ
0xC6F9	ア	こ
0xC6FA	ィ	ご
0xC6FB	イ	さ
0xC6FC	ゥ	ざ
0xC6FD	ウ	し
0xC6FE	ェ	じ
0xC740	エ	す
0xC741	ォ	ず
0xC742	オ	せ
0xC743	カ	ぜ
0xC744	ガ	そ
0xC745	キ	ぞ
0xC746	ギ	た
0xC747	ク	だ
0xC748	グ	ち
0xC749	ケ	ぢ
0xC74A	ゲ	っ
0xC74B	コ	つ
0xC74C	ゴ	づ
0xC74D	サ	て
0xC74E	ザ	で
0xC74F	シ	と
0xC750	ジ	ど
0xC751	ス	な
0xC752	ズ	に
0xC753	セ	ぬ
0xC754	ゼ	ね
0xC755	ソ	の
0xC756	ゾ	は
0xC757	タ	ば
0xC758	ダ	ぱ
0xC759	チ	ひ
0xC75A	ヂ	び
0xC75B	ッ	ぴ
0xC75C	ツ	ふ
0xC75D	ヅ	ぶ
0xC75E	テ	ぷ
0xC75F	デ	へ
0xC760	ト	べ
0xC761	ド	ぺ
0xC762	ナ	ほ
0xC763	ニ	ぼ
0xC764	ヌ	ぽ
0xC765	ネ	ま
0xC766	ノ	み
0xC767	ハ	む
0xC768	バ	め
0xC769	パ	も
0xC76A	ヒ	ゃ
0xC76B	ビ	や
0xC76C	ピ	ゅ
0xC76D	フ	ゆ
0xC76E	ブ	ょ
0xC76F	プ	よ
0xC770	ヘ	ら
0xC771	ベ	り
0xC772	ペ	る
0xC773	ホ	れ
0xC774	ボ	ろ
0xC775	ポ	ゎ
0xC776	マ	わ
0xC777	ミ	ゐ
0xC778	ム	ゑ
0xC779	メ	を
0xC77A	モ	ん
0xC77B	ャ	ァ
0xC77C	ヤ	ア
0xC77D	ュ	ィ
0xC77E	ユ	イ
0xC7A1	ョ	ゥ
0xC7A2	ヨ	ウ
0xC7A3	ラ	ェ
0xC7A4	リ	エ
0xC7A5	ル	ォ
0xC7A6	レ	オ
0xC7A7	ロ	カ
0xC7A8	ヮ	ガ
0xC7A9	ワ	キ
0xC7AA	ヰ	ギ
0xC7AB	ヱ	ク
0xC7AC	ヲ	グ
0xC7AD	ン	ケ
0xC7AE	ヴ	ゲ
0xC7AF	ヵ	コ
0xC7B0	ヶ	ゴ
0xC7B1	Д	サ
0xC7B2	Е	ザ
0xC7B3	Ё	シ
0xC7B4	Ж	ジ
0xC7B5	З	ス
0xC7B6	И	ズ
0xC7B7	Й	セ
0xC7B8	К	ゼ
0xC7B9	Л	ソ
0xC7BA	М	ゾ
0xC7BB	У	タ
0xC7BC	Ф	ダ
0xC7BD	Х	チ
0xC7BE	Ц	ヂ
0xC7BF	Ч	ッ
0xC7C0	Ш	ツ
0xC7C1	Щ	ヅ
0xC7C2	Ъ	テ
0xC7C3	Ы	デ
0xC7C4	Ь	ト
0xC7C5	Э	ド
0xC7C6	Ю	ナ
0xC7C7	Я	ニ
0xC7C8	а	ヌ
0xC7C9	б	ネ
0xC7CA	в	ノ
0xC7CB	г	ハ
0xC7CC	д	バ
0xC7CD	е	パ
0xC7CE	ё	ヒ
0xC7CF	ж	ビ
0xC7D0	з	ピ
0xC7D1	и	フ
0xC7D2	й	ブ
0xC7D3	к	プ
0xC7D4	л	ヘ
0xC7D5	м	ベ
0xC7D6	н	ペ
0xC7D7	о	ホ
0xC7D8	п	ボ
0xC7D9	р	ポ
0xC7DA	с	マ
0xC7DB	т	ミ
0xC7DC	у	ム
0xC7DD	ф	メ
0xC7DE	х	モ
0xC7DF	ц	ャ
0xC7E0	ч	ヤ
0xC7E1	ш	ュ
0xC7E2	щ	ユ
0xC7E3	ъ	ョ
0xC7E4	ы	ヨ
0xC7E5	ь	ラ
0xC7E6	э	リ
0xC7E7	ю	ル
0xC7E8	я	レ
0xC7E9	①	ロ
0xC7EA	②	ヮ
0xC7EB	③	ワ
0xC7EC	④	ヰ
0xC7ED	⑤	ヱ
0xC7EE	⑥	ヲ
0xC7EF	⑦	ン
0xC7F0	⑧	ヴ
0xC7F1	⑨	ヵ
0xC7F2	⑩	ヶ
0xC7F3	⑴	А
0xC7F4	⑵	Б
0xC7F5	⑶	В
0xC7F6	⑷	Г
0xC7F7	⑸	Д
0xC7F8	⑹	Е
0xC7F9	⑺	Ё
0xC7FA	⑻	Ж
0xC7FB	⑼	З
0xC7FC	⑽	И
0xC7FD	(not used)	Й
0xC7FE	(not used)	К
0xC840	(not used)	Л
0xC841	(not used)	М
0xC842	(not used)	Н
0xC843	(not used)	О
0xC844	(not used)	П
0xC845	(not used)	Р
0xC846	(not used)	С
0xC847	(not used)	Т
0xC848	(not used)	У
0xC849	(not used)	Ф
0xC84A	(not used)	Х
0xC84B	(not used)	Ц
0xC84C	(not used)	Ч
0xC84D	(not used)	Ш
0xC84E	(not used)	Щ
0xC84F	(not used)	Ъ
0xC850	(not used)	Ы
0xC851	(not used)	Ь
0xC852	(not used)	Э
0xC853	(not used)	Ю
0xC854	(not used)	Я
0xC855	(not used)	а
0xC856	(not used)	б
0xC857	(not used)	в
0xC858	(not used)	г
0xC859	(not used)	д
0xC85A	(not used)	е
0xC85B	(not used)	ё
0xC85C	(not used)	ж
0xC85D	(not used)	з
0xC85E	(not used)	и
0xC85F	(not used)	й
0xC860	(not used)	к
0xC861	(not used)	л
0xC862	(not used)	м
0xC863	(not used)	н
0xC864	(not used)	о
0xC865	(not used)	п
0xC866	(not used)	р
0xC867	(not used)	с
0xC868	(not used)	т
0xC869	(not used)	у
0xC86A	(not used)	ф
0xC86B	(not used)	х
0xC86C	(not used)	ц
0xC86D	(not used)	ч
0xC86E	(not used)	ш
0xC86F	(not used)	щ
0xC870	(not used)	ъ
0xC871	(not used)	ы
0xC872	(not used)	ь
0xC873	(not used)	э
0xC874	(not used)	ю
0xC875	(not used)	я

== See also ==
- Unicode
- Han unification
- Chinese input methods for computers
