= ETen Chinese System =

ETen Chinese System (倚天中文系統) was a popular DOS-compatible traditional Chinese operating system before Chinese Windows 95.

DOS did not support Chinese characters, which are not in Extended ASCII. Many companies in Taiwan developed their own IBM PC compatible traditional Chinese operating system running on DOS, which were mutually incompatible between the OS, such as Kuo Chiao (國喬) and Acer.

The developer of the Eten OS, E-TEN, earned their early profits from sales of their hardware based plug-in card based Chinese system products. Their software (only) Chinese systems were widely copied by many traditional Chinese users and software pirates, but this was difficult for E-TEN to control. Most traditional Chinese products were compatible with the Eten OS at that time. The system also extended the Big-5 encoding with 7 additional Chinese characters and various symbols, which is later known as the Big5 encoding ETen extension.

When Microsoft developed the Chinese Windows 3.1 and Windows 95, traditional Chinese software developer and users shifted to Windows from DOS. The last version of the Eten OS was a Chinese Windows-compatible version. The Eten and other traditional Chinese OS are now used in a few DOS based POS systems.
