= Single-byte character set =

Character encoding using one byte per character

A single-byte character set (SBCS) is a character encoding that uses exactly one byte for each graphic character. A SBCS can accommodate a maximum of 256 symbols, and is useful for scripts that do not have many symbols or accented letters, such as the Latin, Greek, and Cyrillic scripts used mainly for European languages. Examples of SBCS encodings include ISO/IEC 646, the various ISO 8859 encodings, and the various Microsoft/IBM code pages.‍‍

Single-byte character sets are contrasted against double-byte and triple-byte character sets as well as multi-byte character sets. Multi-byte character sets are used to accommodate languages with scripts that have large numbers of characters and symbols, predominantly Asian languages such as Chinese, Japanese, and Korean (sometimes referred to as "CJK"). In these character encodings, SBCS are traditionally associated with half-width characters, so-called because such single-byte characters would traditionally occupy half the width of a double-byte character on a computer terminal screen which used a duospaced font.

== Modern use ==
Though single-byte character sets have largely been supplanted by Unicode encodings in modern systems,‍ they have found a niche in code golfing, where the smaller size of characters allows participants to gain an edge if they use SBCS with programming languages which facilitate their use for increased code compactness, such as Vyxal‍ and GolfScript.

== See also ==
- Double-byte character set
- Triple-byte character set
- Multi-byte character set
