= E-TEN =

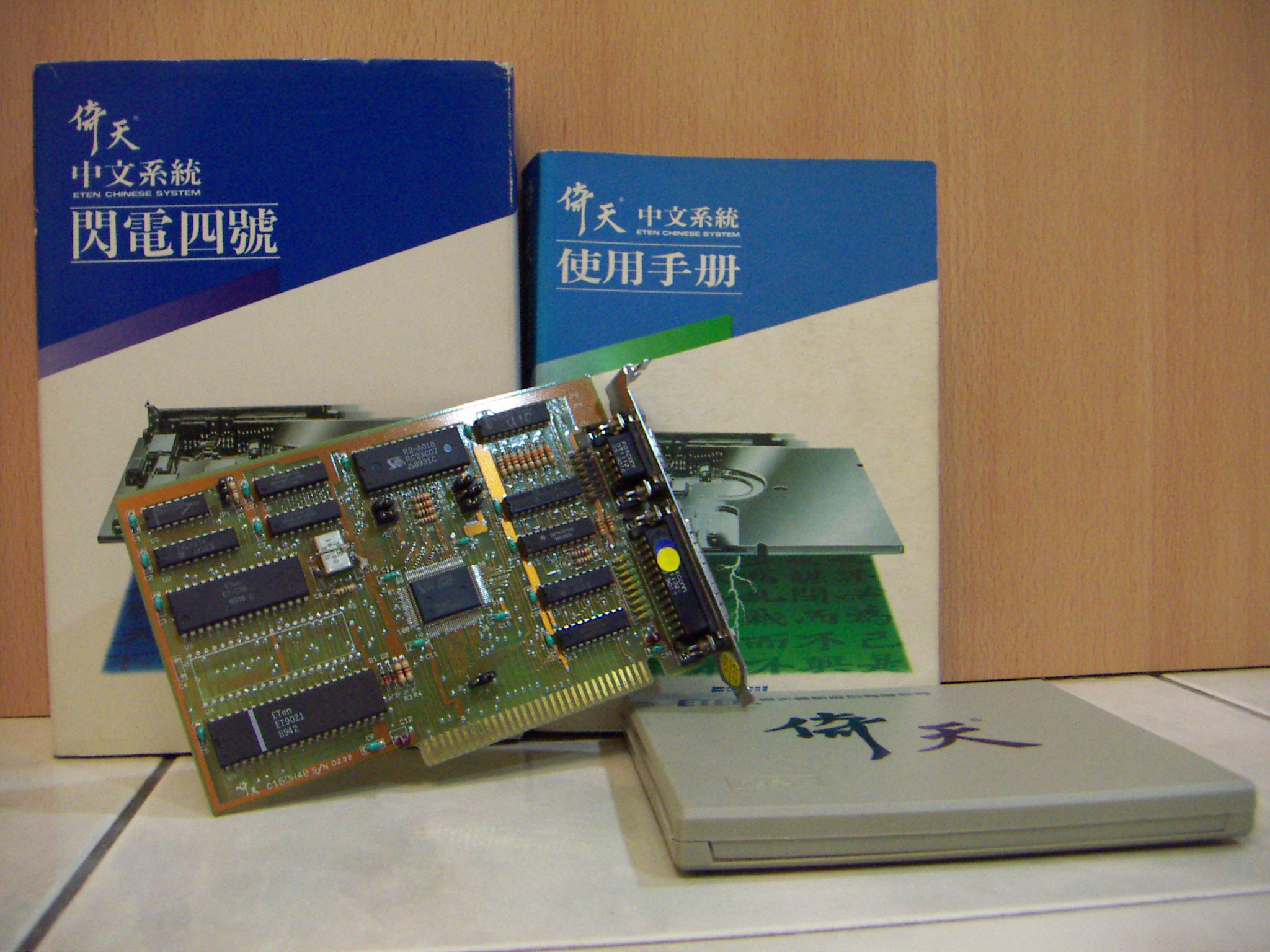
E-TEN Chinese System ISA card

E-TEN Information Systems Co., Ltd. (倚天資訊股份有限公司) was an electronics manufacturing company based in Taiwan, specializing in sophisticated handheld devices such as smartphones.

Founded in 1985 in Taipei, E-TEN initially became known for its Chinese language input system for MS-DOS compatible computers. The company went on to introduce various computer products, both hardware and software, building on its experience in rendering Chinese characters. Market offerings included a publishing application, a laser printer, and a Windows-based input system.

E-TEN turned to handheld devices in 1997, with the introduction of a real-time stock trading "financial pager" that became popular in the financial community of Taiwan. Then the company focused on manufacturing advanced communicators (both branded and ODM) based on Windows Mobile, as well as DAB receivers.

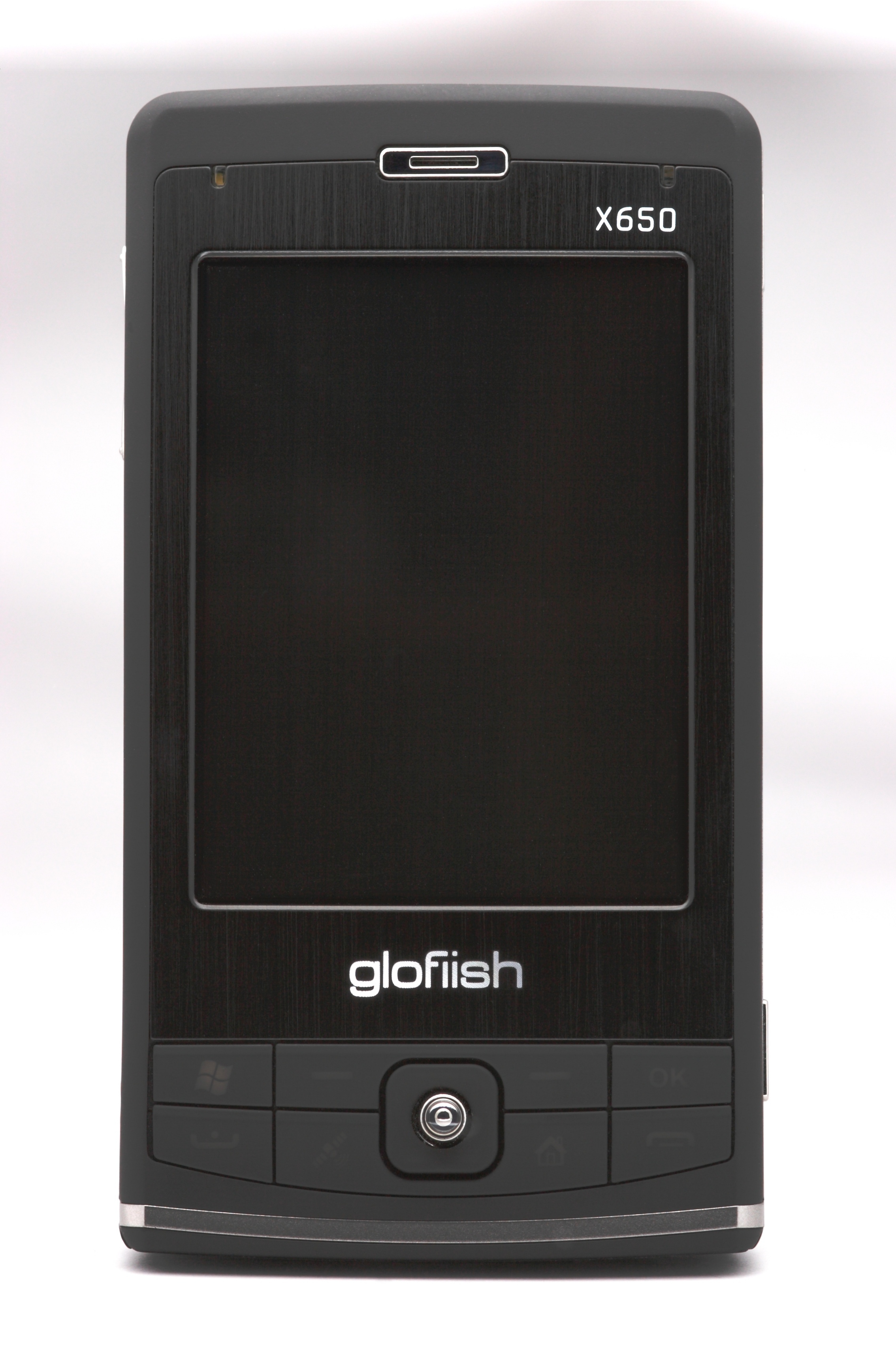
E-TEN Glofiish X650 smartphone

In 2006, E-TEN introduced their new Glofiish line of smartphones; the X500 and M700. Both models featured GSM, Bluetooth, Wi-Fi and GPS. First Glofiish Model with 3G support is the X800, which is released Q3 2007, followed by the M800 with a sliding keyboard released shortly after. The Torq N100 smartphone was the first mobile phone to have an integrated 10 megapixel CMOS sensor, TV tuner and a camcorder that shot up to 30 frames per second DVD quality.

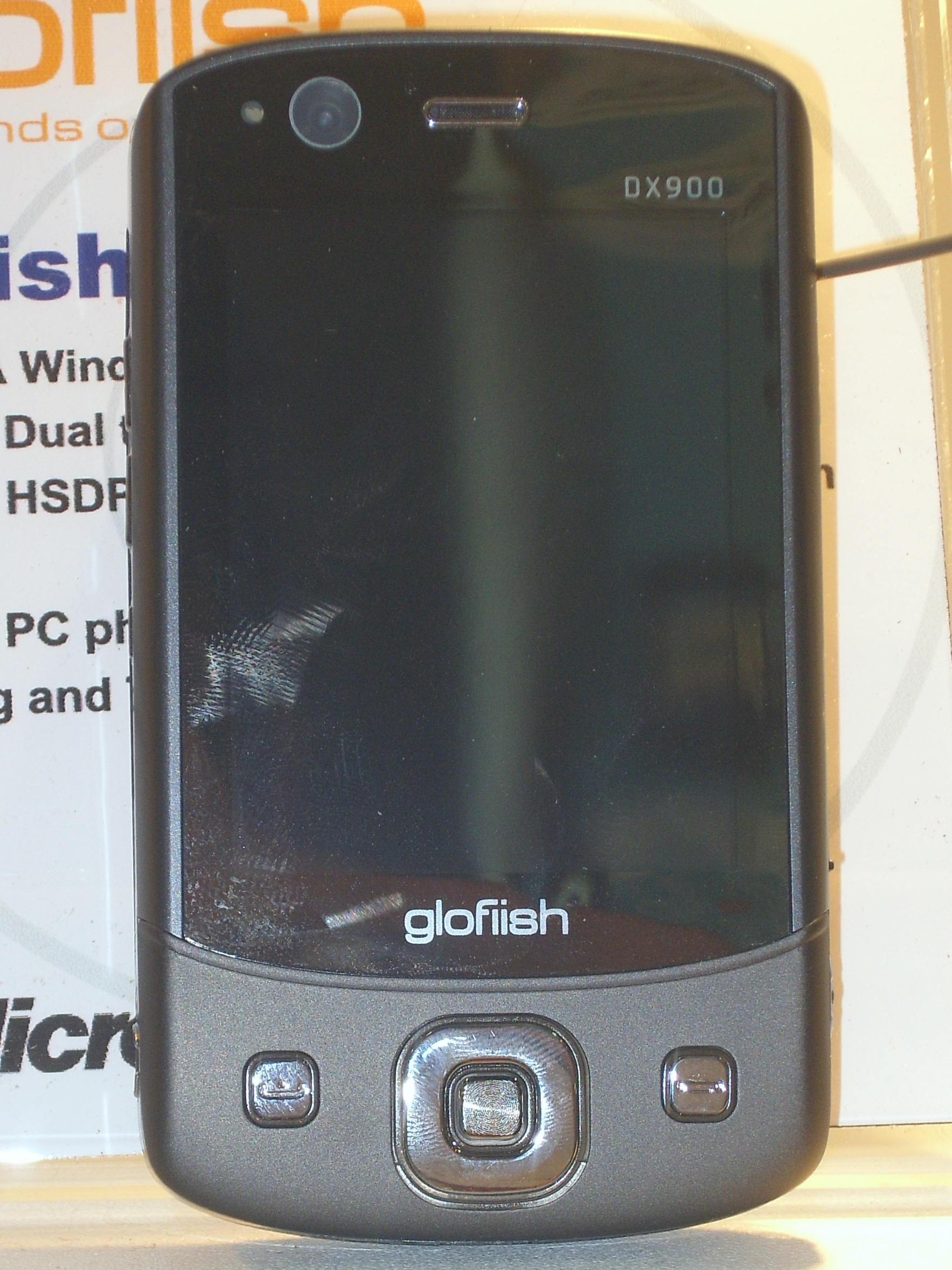
E-TEN Glofiish DX900

E-TEN was awarded the Best Choice of Computex Award 2008 for its Glofiish DX900 – the first dual-SIM Windows Mobile handset to support HSDPA and EDGE. The DX900 was showcased at the E-TEN booth along with three more Pocket PC phones - the V900, the X900, and the X610. Russia was the most successful market for E-TEN products. The company had significant market share there - up to 20.52% (Q1 2008), making it one of the few markets where HTC Corporation was not a market leader in Windows Mobile-based devices

In March, 2008 Acer announced that it would buy E-TEN for $290 million (US). Acer chairman J.T. Wang stated that the "acquisition of E-TEN increases Acer's global footprint by giving us a strong and highly credible presence in the mobility segment." After the buyout, the E-TEN brand was discontinued, and the Acer name was used on all future products.

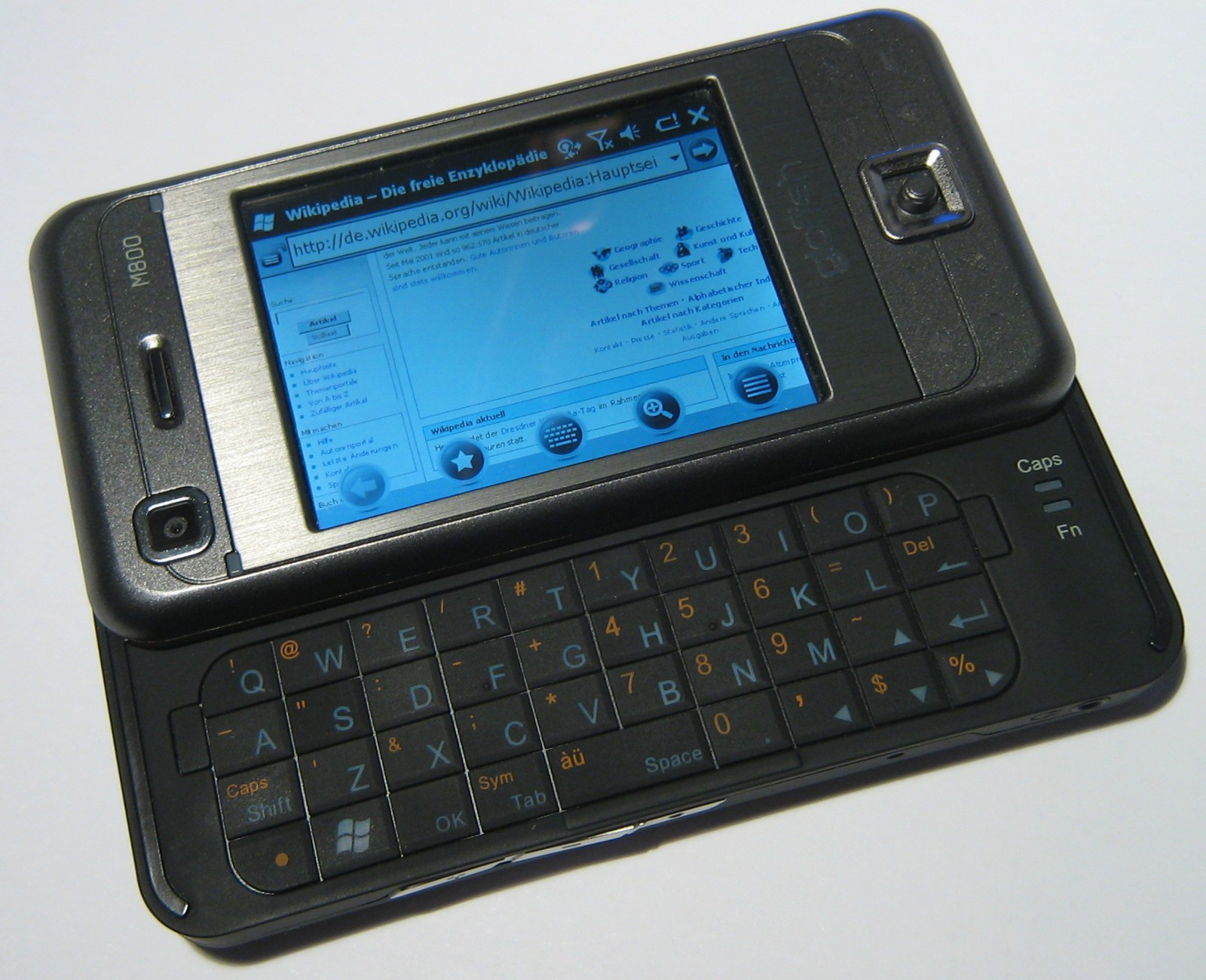
E-TEN Glofiish M800
