= Ha (kana) =

ha

Hiragana	Katakana
- Transliteration: ha, wa
- Translit. with dakuten: ba
- Translit. with handakuten: pa
- Hiragana origin: 波
- Katakana origin: 八
- Man'yōgana: 八 方 芳 房 半 伴 倍 泊 波 婆 破 薄 播 幡 羽 早 者 速 葉 歯
- Voiced man'yōgana: 伐 婆 磨 魔
- Spelling kana: はがきのハ Hagaki no "ha"
- Unicode: U+306F, U+30CF
- Braille: ⠥
- Note: This mora was historically pronounced as "pa".

Ha (hiragana: は, katakana: ハ) is one of the Japanese kana, each of which represent one mora. Both represent [ha]. They are also used as a grammatical particle (in such cases, they denote [wa], including in the greeting "konnichi wa") and serve as the topic marker of the sentence. は originates from 波 and ハ from 八.

In the Sakhalin dialect of the Ainu language, the katakana ハ can be written as small ㇵ to represent a final h sound after an a sound (アㇵ ah). This, along with other extended katakana, was developed by Japanese linguists to represent sounds in Ainu not present in standard Japanese katakana.

When used as a particle, は is pronounced as わ [wa]. は is also pronounced as わ in some words (e.g. もののあはれ pronounced as mono no aware).

Form	Rōmaji	Hiragana	Katakana
Normal h- (は行 ha-gyō)	ha	は	ハ
Normal h- (は行 ha-gyō)	haa hā	はあ, はぁ はー	ハア, ハァ ハー
Addition dakuten b- (ば行 ba-gyō)	ba	ば	バ
Addition dakuten b- (ば行 ba-gyō)	baa bā	ばあ, ばぁ ばー	バア, バァ バー
Addition handakuten p- (ぱ行 pa-gyō)	pa	ぱ	パ
Addition handakuten p- (ぱ行 pa-gyō)	paa pā	ぱあ, ぱぁ ぱー	パア, パァ パー

== Stroke order ==
Stroke order in writing は

Stroke order in writing ハ

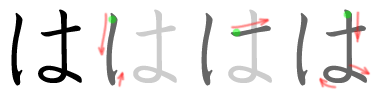
Stroke order in writing は

The Hiragana は is made with three strokes:

1. A vertical line on the left side with a small curve.
2. A horizontal stroke near the center.
3. A vertical stroke on the right at the center of the second stroke followed by a loop near the end.

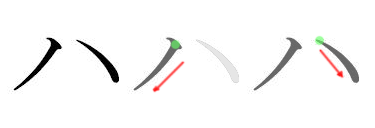
Stroke order in writing ハ

The Katakana ハ is made with two strokes:

1. A straight stroke from the top pointing towards the bottom left.
2. Another straight stroke going the opposite way, i.e. from the top to the bottom right

The hiragana は is read as "wa" when it represents a particle.

== Other communicative representations ==
Japanese radiotelephony alphabet	Wabun code
はがきのハ; Hagaki no "Ha"	▄▄▄ ▄ ▄ ▄

Japanese Navy Signal Flag

Japanese semaphore
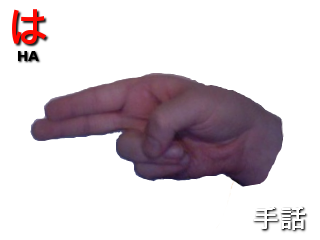
Japanese manual syllabary (fingerspelling)
Braille dots-136
Japanese Braille

=== Braille forms ===
は / ハ in Japanese Braille
は / ハ ha	ば / バ ba	ぱ / パ pa	はあ / ハー hā	ばあ / バー bā	ぱあ / パー pā
⠥ (braille pattern dots-136)	⠐ (braille pattern dots-5) ⠥ (braille pattern dots-136)	⠠ (braille pattern dots-6) ⠥ (braille pattern dots-136)	⠥ (braille pattern dots-136) ⠒ (braille pattern dots-25)	⠐ (braille pattern dots-5) ⠥ (braille pattern dots-136) ⠒ (braille pattern dots-25)	⠠ (braille pattern dots-6) ⠥ (braille pattern dots-136) ⠒ (braille pattern dots-25)
Other kana based on Braille は
ひゃ / ヒャ hya	びゃ / ビャ bya	ぴゃ / ピャ pya	ひゃあ / ヒャー hyā	びゃあ / ビャー byā	ぴゃあ / ピャー pyā
⠈ (braille pattern dots-4) ⠥ (braille pattern dots-136)	⠘ (braille pattern dots-45) ⠥ (braille pattern dots-136)	⠨ (braille pattern dots-46) ⠥ (braille pattern dots-136)	⠈ (braille pattern dots-4) ⠥ (braille pattern dots-136) ⠒ (braille pattern dots-25)	⠘ (braille pattern dots-45) ⠥ (braille pattern dots-136) ⠒ (braille pattern dots-25)	⠨ (braille pattern dots-46) ⠥ (braille pattern dots-136) ⠒ (braille pattern dots-25)

=== Computer encodings ===
Character information
Preview	は		ハ		ﾊ		ㇵ		㋩	
Unicode name	HIRAGANA LETTER HA		KATAKANA LETTER HA		HALFWIDTH KATAKANA LETTER HA		KATAKANA LETTER SMALL HA		CIRCLED KATAKANA HA	
Encodings	decimal	hex	dec	hex	dec	hex	dec	hex	dec	hex
Unicode	12399	U+306F	12495	U+30CF	65418	U+FF8A	12789	U+31F5	13033	U+32E9
UTF-8	227 129 175	E3 81 AF	227 131 143	E3 83 8F	239 190 138	EF BE 8A	227 135 181	E3 87 B5	227 139 169	E3 8B A9
Numeric character reference	&#12399;	&#x306F;	&#12495;	&#x30CF;	&#65418;	&#xFF8A;	&#12789;	&#x31F5;	&#13033;	&#x32E9;
Shift JIS (plain)	130 205	82 CD	131 110	83 6E	202	CA				
Shift JIS-2004	130 205	82 CD	131 110	83 6E	202	CA	131 241	83 F1		
EUC-JP (plain)	164 207	A4 CF	165 207	A5 CF	142 202	8E CA				
EUC-JIS-2004	164 207	A4 CF	165 207	A5 CF	142 202	8E CA	166 243	A6 F3		
GB 18030	164 207	A4 CF	165 207	A5 CF	132 49 153 56	84 31 99 38	129 57 188 57	81 39 BC 39		
EUC-KR / UHC	170 207	AA CF	171 207	AB CF						
Big5 (non-ETEN kana)	198 211	C6 D3	199 103	C7 67						
Big5 (ETEN / HKSCS)	199 86	C7 56	199 203	C7 CB						

Character information
Preview	ば		バ		ぱ		パ	
Unicode name	HIRAGANA LETTER BA		KATAKANA LETTER BA		HIRAGANA LETTER PA		KATAKANA LETTER PA	
Encodings	decimal	hex	dec	hex	dec	hex	dec	hex
Unicode	12400	U+3070	12496	U+30D0	12401	U+3071	12497	U+30D1
UTF-8	227 129 176	E3 81 B0	227 131 144	E3 83 90	227 129 177	E3 81 B1	227 131 145	E3 83 91
Numeric character reference	&#12400;	&#x3070;	&#12496;	&#x30D0;	&#12401;	&#x3071;	&#12497;	&#x30D1;
Shift JIS	130 206	82 CE	131 111	83 6F	130 207	82 CF	131 112	83 70
EUC-JP	164 208	A4 D0	165 208	A5 D0	164 209	A4 D1	165 209	A5 D1
GB 18030	164 208	A4 D0	165 208	A5 D0	164 209	A4 D1	165 209	A5 D1
EUC-KR / UHC	170 208	AA D0	171 208	AB D0	170 209	AA D1	171 209	AB D1
Big5 (non-ETEN kana)	198 212	C6 D4	199 104	C7 68	198 213	C6 D5	199 105	C7 69
Big5 (ETEN / HKSCS)	199 87	C7 57	199 204	C7 CC	199 88	C7 58	199 205	C7 CD

== See also ==
- Japanese grammar
