= Ro (kana) =

ro

Hiragana	Katakana
- Transliteration: ro
- Hiragana origin: 呂
- Katakana origin: 呂
- Man'yōgana: 路 漏 呂 侶
- Spelling kana: ローマのロ Rōma no "ro"
- Unicode: U+308D, U+30ED
- Braille: ⠚
- Note: These Man'yōgana originally represented morae with one of two different vowel sounds, which merged in later pronunciation

Ro (hiragana: ろ, katakana: ロ) (romanised as ro) is one of the Japanese kana, each of which represents one mora. The hiragana is written in one stroke, katakana in three. Both represent [ɾo] and both originate from the Chinese character 呂. The Ainu language uses a small ㇿ to represent a final r sound after an o sound (オㇿ or).

Form	Rōmaji	Hiragana	Katakana
Normal r- (ら行 ra-gyō)	ro	ろ	ロ
Normal r- (ら行 ra-gyō)	rou roo rō	ろう, ろぅ ろお, ろぉ ろー	ロウ, ロゥ ロオ, ロォ ロー

== Stroke order ==
Stroke order in writing ろ

Stroke order in writing ロ

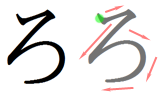
Stroke order in writing ろ

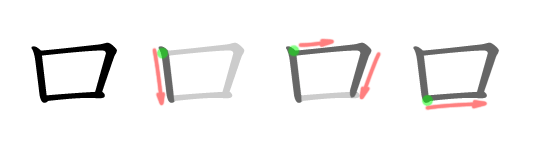
Stroke order in writing 口

== Other communicative representations ==
Japanese radiotelephony alphabet	Wabun code
口ーマの口; Rōma no "Ro"	▄ ▄▄▄ ▄ ▄▄▄

Japanese Navy Signal Flag

Japanese semaphore

Japanese manual syllabary (fingerspelling)
Braille dots-245
Japanese Braille

=== Braille forms ===
ろ / 口 in Japanese Braille
ろ / 口 ro	ろう / 口ー rō	Other kana based on Braille ろ	
ろ / 口 ro	ろう / 口ー rō	りょ / リョ ryo	りょう / リョー ryō
⠚ (braille pattern dots-245)	⠚ (braille pattern dots-245) ⠒ (braille pattern dots-25)	⠈ (braille pattern dots-4) ⠚ (braille pattern dots-245)	⠈ (braille pattern dots-4) ⠚ (braille pattern dots-245) ⠒ (braille pattern dots-25)

=== Computer encodings ===
Character information
Preview	ろ		口		ﾛ		ㇿ		㋺	
Unicode name	HIRAGANA LETTER RO		KATAKANA LETTER RO		HALFWIDTH KATAKANA LETTER RO		KATAKANA LETTER SMALL RO		CIRCLED KATAKANA RO	
Encodings	decimal	hex	dec	hex	dec	hex	dec	hex	dec	hex
Unicode	12429	U+308D	21475	U+53E3	65435	U+FF9B	12799	U+31FF	13050	U+32FA
UTF-8	227 130 141	E3 82 8D	229 143 163	E5 8F A3	239 190 155	EF BE 9B	227 135 191	E3 87 BF	227 139 186	E3 8B BA
Numeric character reference	&#12429;	&#x308D;	&#21475;	&#x53E3;	&#65435;	&#xFF9B;	&#12799;	&#x31FF;	&#13050;	&#x32FA;
Shift JIS (plain)	130 235	82 EB	131 141	83 8D	219	DB				
Shift JIS-2004	130 235	82 EB	131 141	83 8D	219	DB	131 252	83 FC		
EUC-JP (plain)	164 237	A4 ED	165 237	A5 ED	142 219	8E DB				
EUC-JIS-2004	164 237	A4 ED	165 237	A5 ED	142 219	8E DB	166 254	A6 FE		
GB 18030	164 237	A4 ED	165 237	A5 ED	132 49 155 53	84 31 9B 35	129 57 189 57	81 39 BD 39		
EUC-KR / UHC	170 237	AA ED	171 237	AB ED						
Big5 (non-ETEN kana)	198 241	C6 F1	199 167	C7 A7						
Big5 (ETEN / HKSCS)	199 116	C7 74	199 233	C7 E9						

== See also ==
- Japanese phonology
