= Scantling =

Measurement of prescribed size, dimensions, or cross sectional areas

Scantling is a measurement of prescribed size, dimensions, or cross sectional areas.

When used in regard to timber, the scantling is (also "the scantlings are") the thickness and breadth, the sectional dimensions; in the case of stone it refers to the dimensions of thickness, breadth and length.

The word is a variation of scantillon, a carpenter's or stonemason's measuring tool, also used of the measurements taken by it, and of a piece of timber of small size cut as a sample. Sometimes synonymous with story pole. The Old French escantillon, mod. échantillon, is usually taken to be related to Italian scandaglio, sounding-line (Latin scandere, to climb; cf. scansio, the metrical scansion). It was probably influenced by cantel, cantle, a small piece, a corner piece.

== Shipbuilding ==
In shipbuilding, scantling refers to the collective dimensions of the framing (apart from the keel) to which planks or plates are attached to form the hull. The word is most often used in the plural to describe how much structural strength, from girders, I-beams, etc., is in a given section.

=== Scantling length ===
The scantling length refers to the structural length of a ship. Its distance is slightly less than the waterline length of a ship, and generally less than the overall length of a ship.

In the American Bureau of Shipping's Rules for Building and Classing Steel Vessels, it is defined as the distance on the summer load line from the fore side of the stem to the centerline of the rudder stock. Scantling length need not be less than 96%, nor more than 97% of the length of the summer load line.

Most other classification societies use a similar definition of scantling length to define the general length of a ship. The scantling length is used by classification societies for all calculations where the waterline length, overall length, displacement length, etc. is called for. Naval architects wishing to comply with class rules would also use the scantling length.

== Shipping ==
In shipping, a full scantling vessel is understood to be a geared ship that can reach all parts of its own cargo spaces with its own cranes.
