= Unicode compatibility characters =

Characters encoded solely to maintain round-trip convertibility with other standards

In Unicode and the Universal Character Set (UCS), a compatibility character is a character that is encoded solely to maintain round-trip convertibility with other, often older standards. According to the Unicode Glossary:

A character that would not have been encoded except for compatibility and round-trip convertibility with other standards.

Although the term compatibility appears in character names, it is not itself represented as a distinct character property. In practice, the definition is more complex. One of the properties assigned to characters by the Unicode Consortium is decomposition, including compatibility decomposition. More than five thousand characters have a compatibility decomposition mapping that relates the compatibility character to one or more other UCS characters. By assigning a compatibility decomposition to a character, Unicode effectively designates it as a compatibility character.

The reasons for assigning compatibility status vary and are discussed in more detail below. The term decomposition can be confusing, because in some cases a character’s decomposition consists of a single character. In such cases, the decomposition maps one character to another that is approximately—but not canonically—equivalent.

== Compatibility character types and keywords ==
The compatibility decomposition property for the 5,402 Unicode compatibility characters includes a keyword that divides the compatibility characters into 17 logical groups. Those characters with a compatibility decomposition but without a keyword are termed canonically decomposable characters and those characters are not compatibility characters. Keywords for compatibility decomposable characters include: initial, medial, final, isolated, wide, narrow, small, square, vertical, circle, noBreak, fraction, sub, super, and compat. These keywords provide some indication of the relation between the compatibility character and its compatibility decomposition character sequence. Compatibility characters fall into three basic categories:

1. Characters corresponding to multiple alternate glyph forms and precomposed diacritics to support software and font implementations that do not include complete Unicode text layout capabilities.
2. Characters included from other character sets or otherwise added to the UCS that constitute rich text rather than the plain text goals of Unicode.
3. Some other characters that are semantically distinct, but visually similar.

Because these semantically distinct characters may be displayed with glyphs similar to the glyphs of other characters, text processing software should try to address possible confusion for the sake of end users. When comparing and collating (sorting) text strings, different forms and rich text variants of characters should not alter the text processing results. For example, software users may be confused when performing a "find" on a page for a capital Latin letter I and their software application fails to find the visually similar Roman numeral Ⅰ.

== Compatibility mappings types ==
=== Glyph substitution and composition ===
Some compatibility characters are completely dispensable for text processing and display software that conforms to the Unicode standard. These include:

Ligatures
Ligatures such as ﬃ in the Latin script were often encoded as a separate character in legacy character sets. Unicode's approach to ligatures is to treat them as rich text and, if turned on, handle them through glyph substitution.
Precomposed Roman numerals
For example, U+216B Ⅻ ROMAN NUMERAL TWELVE can be decomposed into U+2169 Ⅹ ROMAN NUMERAL TEN and two U+2160 Ⅰ ROMAN NUMERAL ONE characters. Precomposed characters are in the Number Forms block.
Precomposed fractions
These decompositions have the keyword <fraction>. A fully conforming text handler should display U+00BC ¼ VULGAR FRACTION ONE QUARTER identically to the composed fraction 1/4 (numeral 1 with U+2044 / FRACTION SLASH and numeral 4). Precomposed characters are in the Number Forms block.
Contextual glyphs or forms
These arise primarily in the Arabic script. Using fonts with glyph substitution capabilities such as OpenType and TrueTypeGX, Unicode conforming software can substitute the proper glyphs for the same character depending on whether that character appears at the beginning, end, middle of a word, or in isolation. Such glyph substitution is also necessary for vertical (top to bottom) text layout for some East Asian languages. In this case glyphs must be substituted or synthesized for wide, narrow, small and square glyph forms. Non-conforming software or software using other character sets instead use multiple separate characters for the same letter depending on its position: further complicating text processing.

The UCS, Unicode character properties and the Unicode algorithms provide software implementations with everything needed to properly display these characters from their decomposition equivalents. Therefore, these decomposable compatibility characters become redundant and unnecessary. Their existence in the character set requires extra text processing to ensure text is properly compared and collated (see Unicode normalization). Moreover, these compatibility characters provide no additional or distinct semantics. Nor do these characters provide any visually distinct rendering, provided the text layout and fonts are Unicode conforming. Also, none of these characters are required for round-trip convertibility to other character sets, since the transliteration can easily map decomposed characters to precomposed counterparts in another character set. Similarly, contextual forms, such as a final Arabic letter can be mapped based on its position within a word to the appropriate legacy character set form character.

In order to dispense with these compatibility characters, text software must conform to several Unicode protocols. The software must be able to:

1. Compose diacritic marked graphemes from letter characters and one or more separate combining diacritic marks.
2. Substitute (at the author or reader's discretion) ligatures and contextual glyph variants.
3. Lay out CJKV text vertically (at the author's or reader's discretion), substituting glyphs for small, vertical, narrow, wide square forms, either from font data or synthesized as needed.
4. Combine fractions using the U+2044 / FRACTION SLASH and any other arbitrary characters.
5. Combine a U+0338 ̸ COMBINING LONG SOLIDUS OVERLAY with other symbols: for example ∄ or ∄ for U+2204 ∄ THERE DOES NOT EXIST.

Altogether, these compatibility characters included for incomplete Unicode implementations total 3,779 of the 5,402 designated compatibility characters. These include all of the compatibility characters marked with the keywords <initial>, <medial>, <final>, <isolated>, <fraction>, <wide>, <narrow>, <small>, <vertical>, <square>. It also includes nearly all of the canonical and most of the <compat> keyword compatibility characters (the exceptions include those <compat> keyword characters for enclosed alphanumerics, enclosed ideographs and those discussed in § Semantically distinct characters).

=== Rich text compatibility characters ===
Many other compatibility characters constitute what Unicode considers rich text and therefore outside the goals of Unicode and UCS. In some sense even compatibility characters discussed in the previous section—those that aid legacy software in displaying ligatures and vertical text—constitute a form of rich text, since the rich text protocols determine whether text is displayed in one way or another. However, the choice to display text with or without ligatures or vertically versus horizontally are both non-semantic rich text. They are simply style differences. This is in contrast to other rich text such as italics, superscripts and subscripts, or list markers where the styling of the rich text implies certain semantics along with it.

For comparing, collating, handling and storing plain text, rich text variants are semantically redundant. For example, using a superscript character for the numeral 4 is likely indistinguishable from using the standard character for a numeral 4 and then using rich text protocols to make it superscript. Such alternate rich text characters therefore create ambiguity because they appear visually similar as their plain text counterpart characters with rich text formatting applied. These rich text compatibility characters include:

Mathematical Alphanumeric Symbols
These symbols are simply clones of the Latin, Greek alphabets, and Indic-Arabic decimal digits repeated in 15 various typefaces. They are intended as an arbitrary palette for mathematical notation. However they tend to undermine the distinction between encoding characters versus encoding visual glyphs, as well as Unicode's goals of supporting only plain text characters. Such alternate styling for a mathematical symbol palette could be easily created through rich text protocols instead.
Enclosed Alphanumerics and ideographs (markers)
These are characters included primarily for list markers. They do not constitute plain text characters. Moreover, the use of other rich text protocols is more appropriate since, the set of enclosed alphanumerics or ideographs provisioned in the UCS is limited.
Circled alphanumerics and ideographs
The circled forms are also likely for use as markers. Again, using characters along with rich text protocols to encircle character strings is more flexible.
Spaces and no-break spaces of varying widths
These characters are simply rich text variants of U+0020 SPACE and U+00A0 NO-BREAK SPACE. Other rich text protocols should be used instead such as tracking, kerning or word-spacing attributes.
Some subscript and superscript form characters
Many of the subscript and superscript characters are actually semantically distinct characters from the International Phonetic Alphabet and other writing systems and do not really fall in the category of rich text. However, others simply constitute rich text presentation forms of other Greek, Latin, and numeral characters. These rich text superscript and subscript characters therefore properly belong to this category of rich text compatibility characters. Most of these are in the "Superscripts and Subscripts" or the "Basic Latin" blocks.

For all of these rich text compatibility characters, the display of glyphs is typically distinct from their compatibility decomposition (related) characters. However, these are considered compatibility characters and discouraged for use by the Unicode consortium because they are not plain text characters, which is what Unicode seeks to support with its UCS and associated protocols. Rich text should be handled through non-Unicode protocols such as HTML, CSS, RTF and others.

The rich text compatibility characters comprise 1,451 of the 5,402 compatibility characters. These include all of the compatibility characters marked with keywords <circle> and <font> (except three listed in the semantically distinct below); 11 spaces variants from the <compat> and canonical characters; and some of the keyword <superscript> and <subscript> from the "Superscripts and Subscripts" block.

=== Semantically distinct characters ===
Many compatibility characters are semantically distinct characters, though they may share representational glyphs with other characters. Some of these characters may have been included because most other characters sets that focused on one script or writing system. For instance, the ISO and other Latin character sets likely included a character for π (pi) since, when focusing on primarily one writing system or script, those character sets would not have otherwise had characters for the common mathematical symbol π;. However, with Unicode, mathematicians are free to use characters from any known script in the World to stand in for a mathematical set or mathematical constant. To date, Unicode has only added specific semantic support for a few such mathematical constants (for example U+210E ℎ PLANCK CONSTANT, and U+2107 ℇ EULER CONSTANT, both of which Unicode considers to be compatibility characters). Therefore, Unicode designates several mathematical symbols based on letters from Greek and Hebrew as compatibility characters. These include:

- Hebrew letter based symbols (4): U+2135 ℵ ALEF SYMBOL, U+2136 ℶ BET SYMBOL, U+2137 ℷ GIMEL SYMBOL and U+2138 ℸ DALET SYMBOL
- Greek letter based symbols (7): U+03D0 ϐ GREEK BETA SYMBOL, U+03D1 ϑ GREEK THETA SYMBOL, U+03D5 ϕ GREEK PHI SYMBOL, U+03D6 ϖ GREEK PI SYMBOL, U+03F0 ϰ GREEK KAPPA SYMBOL, U+03F1 ϱ GREEK RHO SYMBOL, U+03F4 ϴ GREEK CAPITAL THETA SYMBOL

While these compatibility characters are distinguished from their compatibility decomposition characters only by adding the word "symbol" to their name, they do represent long-standing distinct meanings in written mathematics. However, for all practical purposes they share the same semantics as their compatibility equivalent Greek or Hebrew letter. These may be considered border-line semantically distinguishable characters so they are not included in the total.

Though not the intention of Unicode to encode such measurement units the repertoire includes six (6) such symbols that should not be used by authors: the characters' decompositions should be used instead.

- Unit symbols (6): U+212B Å ANGSTROM SIGN: use U+00C5 Å LATIN CAPITAL LETTER A WITH RING ABOVE instead), Ohm (U+2126 Ω : use U+03A9 instead), (U+212A K KELVIN SIGN: use U+004B instead), (U+2109 ℉ DEGREE FAHRENHEIT: use U+00B0 and U+0046 instead), (U+2103 ℃ DEGREE CELSIUS: use U+00B0 ° DEGREE SIGN and U+0043 C LATIN CAPITAL LETTER C instead), U+00B5 µ MICRO SIGN (use U+03BC μ GREEK SMALL LETTER MU instead)

Unicode also designates 22 other letter-like symbols as compatibility characters.

- Other Greek letter-based symbols (3): U+03F5 ϵ GREEK LUNATE EPSILON SYMBOL, U+03F2 ϲ GREEK LUNATE SIGMA SYMBOL, U+03F9 Ϲ GREEK CAPITAL LUNATE SIGMA SYMBOL
- Mathematical constants (3): U+2107 ℇ EULER CONSTANT, U+210E ℎ PLANCK CONSTANT, U+210F ℏ PLANCK CONSTANT OVER TWO PI
- Currency symbols (2): U+20A8 ₨ RUPEE SIGN, U+FDFC ﷼ RIAL SIGN
- Punctuation (4): U+2024 ․ ONE DOT LEADER, U+00A0 NO-BREAK SPACE, U+2011 ‑ NON-BREAKING HYPHEN, U+0F0C ༌ TIBETAN MARK DELIMITER TSHEG BSTAR
- Other letter-like symbols (10): U+2139 ℹ INFORMATION SOURCE, U+2100 ℀ ACCOUNT OF, U+2101 ℁ ADDRESSED TO THE SUBJECT, U+2105 ℅ CARE OF, U+2106 ℆ CADA UNA, U+2116 № NUMERO SIGN, U+2121 ℡ TELEPHONE SIGN, U+213B ℻ FACSIMILE SIGN, U+2122 ™ TRADE MARK SIGN, U+2120 ℠ SERVICE MARK

In addition, several scripts use glyph position such as superscripts and subscripts to differentiate semantics. In these cases subscripts and superscripts are not merely rich text, but constitute a distinct character in the writing system (130 total).

- 112 characters representing abstract phonemes from phonetic alphabets such as the International Phonetic Alphabet use such positional glyphs to represent semantic differences (U+1D2C – U+1D6A, U+1D78, U+1D9B – U+1DBF, U+02B0 – U+02B8, U+02E0 – U+02E4)
- 14 characters from the Kanbun block (U+3192 – U+319F)
- 1 character from the Tifinagh script: U+2D6F ⵯ TIFINAGH MODIFIER LETTER LABIALIZATION MARK
- 1 character from the Georgian script: U+10FC ჼ MODIFIER LETTER GEORGIAN NAR
- 2 ordinal characters U+00AA ª FEMININE ORDINAL INDICATOR and U+00BA º MASCULINE ORDINAL INDICATOR included in the Latin-1 Supplement block

Finally, Unicode designates Roman numerals as compatibility equivalence to the Latin letters that share the same glyphs.

- Capital Roman numerals (7): U+2160 Ⅰ ROMAN NUMERAL ONE, U+2164 Ⅴ ROMAN NUMERAL FIVE, U+2169 Ⅹ ROMAN NUMERAL TEN, U+216C Ⅼ ROMAN NUMERAL FIFTY, U+216D Ⅽ ROMAN NUMERAL ONE HUNDRED, U+216E Ⅾ ROMAN NUMERAL FIVE HUNDRED, U+216F Ⅿ ROMAN NUMERAL ONE THOUSAND
- and lower case variants (7): U+2170 ⅰ SMALL ROMAN NUMERAL ONE, U+2174 ⅴ SMALL ROMAN NUMERAL FIVE, U+2179 ⅹ SMALL ROMAN NUMERAL TEN, U+217C ⅼ SMALL ROMAN NUMERAL FIFTY, U+217D ⅽ SMALL ROMAN NUMERAL ONE HUNDRED, U+217E ⅾ SMALL ROMAN NUMERAL FIVE HUNDRED, U+217F ⅿ SMALL ROMAN NUMERAL ONE THOUSAND
- 18 precomposed Roman numerals in uppercase and lowercase variants (2–4, 6–9 and 11–12)

Roman numeral One Thousand actually has a third character representing a third form or glyph for the same semantic unit: U+2180 ↀ ROMAN NUMERAL ONE THOUSAND C D. From this glyph, one can see where the practice of using a Latin M may have arisen. Strangely, though Unicode unifies the sign-value Roman numerals with the very different (though visually similar) Latin letters, the Indic Arabic place-value (positional) decimal digit numerals are repeated 24 times (a total of 240 code points for 10 numerals) throughout the UCS without any relational or decomposition mapping between them.

The presence of these 167 semantically distinct though visually similar characters (plus the borderline 11 Hebrew and Greek letter based symbols and the 6 measurement unit symbols) among the decomposable characters complicates the topic of compatibility characters. The Unicode standard discourages the use of compatibility characters by content authors. However, in certain specialized areas, these characters are important and quite similar to other characters that have not been included among the compatibility characters. For example, in certain academic circles the use of Roman numerals as distinct from Latin letters that share the same glyphs would be no different from the use of Cuneiform numerals or ancient Greek numerals. Collapsing the Roman numeral characters to Latin letter characters eliminates a semantic distinction. A similar situation exists for phonetic alphabet characters that use subscript or superscript positioned glyphs. In the specialized circles that use phonetic alphabets, authors should be able to do so without resorting to rich text protocols. As another example the keyword 'circle' compatibility characters are often used for describing the game Go. However, these uses of the compatibility characters constitute exceptions where the author has a special reason to use the otherwise discouraged characters.

== Compatibility blocks ==
Several blocks of Unicode characters include either entirely or almost entirely all compatibility characters (U+F900–U+FFEF except for the noncharacters). The compatibility blocks contain none of the semantically distinct compatibility characters with only one exception: the currency symbol U+FDFC ﷼ RIAL SIGN so the compatibility decomposable characters in the compatibility blocks fall unambiguously into the set of discouraged characters. Unicode recommends authors use the plain text compatibility decomposition equivalents instead and complement those characters with rich text markup. This approach is much more flexible and open-ended than using the finite set of circled or enclosed alphanumerics to give just one example.

There are a small number of characters even within the compatibility blocks that themselves are not compatibility characters and therefore may confuse authors. The Enclosed CJK Letters and Months block contains a single non-compatibility character: the U+327F ㉿ KOREAN STANDARD SYMBOL. That symbol and 12 other characters have been included in the blocks for unknown reasons. The CJK Compatibility Ideographs block contains these incorrectly called compatibility unified Han ideographs:

1. U+FA0E 﨎 CJK COMPATIBILITY IDEOGRAPH-FA0E
2. U+FA0F 﨏 CJK COMPATIBILITY IDEOGRAPH-FA0F
3. U+FA11 﨑 CJK COMPATIBILITY IDEOGRAPH-FA11
4. U+FA13 﨓 CJK COMPATIBILITY IDEOGRAPH-FA13
5. U+FA14 﨔 CJK COMPATIBILITY IDEOGRAPH-FA14
6. U+FA1F 﨟 CJK COMPATIBILITY IDEOGRAPH-FA1F
7. U+FA21 﨡 CJK COMPATIBILITY IDEOGRAPH-FA21
8. U+FA23 﨣 CJK COMPATIBILITY IDEOGRAPH-FA23
9. U+FA24 﨤 CJK COMPATIBILITY IDEOGRAPH-FA24
10. U+FA27 﨧 CJK COMPATIBILITY IDEOGRAPH-FA27
11. U+FA28 﨨 CJK COMPATIBILITY IDEOGRAPH-FA28
12. U+FA29 﨩 CJK COMPATIBILITY IDEOGRAPH-FA29

These thirteen characters are not compatibility characters, and their use is not discouraged in any way. However, U+27EAF 𧺯 , the same as U+FA23 﨣 , is mistakenly encoded in CJK Unified Ideographs Extension B. In any event, a normalized text should never contain both U+27EAF 𧺯 and U+FA23 﨣 ; these code points represent the same character, encoded twice.

Several other characters in these blocks have no compatibility mapping but are clearly intended for legacy support:

Alphabetic Presentation Forms (1)

1. U+FB1E ﬞ HEBREW POINT JUDEO-SPANISH VARIKA. This is a glyph variant of U+05BF ֿ HEBREW POINT RAFE, though Unicode provides no compatibility mapping.

Arabic Presentation Forms (4)

1. U+FD3E ﴾ ORNATE LEFT PARENTHESIS. A glyph variant of U+0028 ( LEFT PARENTHESIS
2. U+FD3F ﴿ ORNATE RIGHT PARENTHESIS. A glyph variant of U+0029 ) RIGHT PARENTHESIS
3. U+FDFD ﷽ ARABIC LIGATURE BISMILLAH AR-RAHMAN AR-RAHEEM is a ligature for Beh (U+0628), Seen (U+0633), Meem (U+0645), Space (U+0020), Alef (U+0627), Lam (U+0644), Lam (U+0644), Heh (U+0647), Space (U+0020), Alef (U+0627), Lam (U+0644), Reh (U+0631), Hah (U+062D), Meem (U+0645), Alef (U+0627), Noon (U+0646), Space (U+0020), Alef (U+0627), Lam (U+0644), Reh (U+0631), Hah (U+062D), Yeh (U+064A), Meem (U+0645) i.e. بسم الله الرحمان الرحيم (Similarly, U+FDFA and U+FDFB code for two other Arabic ligatures, of 21 and 9 characters respectively.)
4. U+FE73 ﹳ ARABIC TAIL FRAGMENT for supporting text systems without contextual glyph handling

CJK Compatibility Forms (2 that are both related to CJK Unified Ideograph: U+4E36 丶)

1. U+FE45 ﹅ SESAME DOT
2. U+FE46 ﹆ WHITE SESAME DOT

Enclosed Alphanumerics (21 rich text variants)

1. 11 Negative Circled Numbers (0 and 11 through 20) (U+24FF and U+24EB through U+24F4): ⓿, ⓫ – ⓴
2. 10 Double Circled Numbers (0 through 10) (U+24F5 through U+24FE): ⓵ – ⓾

== Normalization ==
Normalization is the process by which Unicode conforming software first performs full compatibility decomposition (or composition) before making comparisons or collating text strings.

== See also ==
- CJK Compatibility
- CJK Compatibility Forms
- CJK Compatibility Ideographs
