= Number Forms =

- Range: U+2150..U+218F (64 code points)
- Plane: BMP
- Scripts: Latin (41 char.); Common (19 char.)
- Symbol sets: Vulgar fractions Roman numerals
- Assigned: 60 code points
- Unused: 4 reserved code points

Unicode Version History
- 1.0.0 (1991): 48 (+48)
- 3.0 (1999): 49 (+1)
- 5.0 (2006): 50 (+1)
- 5.1 (2008): 54 (+4)
- 5.2 (2009): 58 (+4)
- 8.0 (2015): 60 (+2)

Unicode documentation
- Code chart ∣ Web page

Number Forms is a Unicode block containing Unicode compatibility characters that have specific meaning as numbers, but are constructed from other characters. They consist primarily of vulgar fractions and Roman numerals. In addition to the characters in the Number Forms block, three fractions (¼, ½, and ¾) were inherited from ISO-8859-1, which was incorporated whole as the Latin-1 Supplement block.

== List of characters ==
Unicode Number Forms
Glyph	Simulation	Value	Name	Hex	Dec
⅐	^{1}/_{7} or	0.142...	Vulgar Fraction One Seventh	2150	8528
⅑	^{1}/_{9} or	0.111...	Vulgar Fraction One Ninth	2151	8529
⅒	^{1}/_{10} or	0.1	Vulgar Fraction One Tenth	2152	8530
⅓	^{1}/_{3} or	0.333...	Vulgar Fraction One Third	2153	8531
⅔	^{2}/_{3} or	0.666...	Vulgar Fraction Two Thirds	2154	8532
⅕	^{1}/_{5} or	0.2	Vulgar Fraction One Fifth	2155	8533
⅖	^{2}/_{5} or	0.4	Vulgar Fraction Two Fifths	2156	8534
⅗	^{3}/_{5} or	0.6	Vulgar Fraction Three Fifths	2157	8535
⅘	^{4}/_{5} or	0.8	Vulgar Fraction Four Fifths	2158	8536
⅙	^{1}/_{6} or	0.166...	Vulgar Fraction One Sixth	2159	8537
⅚	^{5}/_{6} or	0.833...	Vulgar Fraction Five Sixths	215A	8538
⅛	^{1}/_{8} or	0.125	Vulgar Fraction One Eighth	215B	8539
⅜	^{3}/_{8} or	0.375	Vulgar Fraction Three Eighths	215C	8540
⅝	^{5}/_{8} or	0.625	Vulgar Fraction Five Eighths	215D	8541
⅞	^{7}/_{8} or	0.875	Vulgar Fraction Seven Eighths	215E	8542
⅟	^{1}/ or	1	Fraction Numerator One	215F	8543
Ⅰ	I	1	Roman Numeral One	2160	8544
Ⅱ	II	2	Roman Numeral Two	2161	8545
Ⅲ	III	3	Roman Numeral Three	2162	8546
Ⅳ	IV	4	Roman Numeral Four	2163	8547
Ⅴ	V	5	Roman Numeral Five	2164	8548
Ⅵ	VI	6	Roman Numeral Six	2165	8549
Ⅶ	VII	7	Roman Numeral Seven	2166	8550
Ⅷ	VIII	8	Roman Numeral Eight	2167	8551
Ⅸ	IX	9	Roman Numeral Nine	2168	8552
Ⅹ	X	10	Roman Numeral Ten	2169	8553
Ⅺ	XI	11	Roman Numeral Eleven	216A	8554
Ⅻ	XII	12	Roman Numeral Twelve	216B	8555
Ⅼ	L	50	Roman Numeral Fifty	216C	8556
Ⅽ	C	100	Roman Numeral One Hundred	216D	8557
Ⅾ	D	500	Roman Numeral Five Hundred	216E	8558
Ⅿ	M	1000	Roman Numeral One Thousand	216F	8559
ⅰ	i	1	Small Roman Numeral One	2170	8560
ⅱ	ii	2	Small Roman Numeral Two	2171	8561
ⅲ	iii	3	Small Roman Numeral Three	2172	8562
ⅳ	iv	4	Small Roman Numeral Four	2173	8563
ⅴ	v	5	Small Roman Numeral Five	2174	8564
ⅵ	vi	6	Small Roman Numeral Six	2175	8565
ⅶ	vii	7	Small Roman Numeral Seven	2176	8566
ⅷ	viii	8	Small Roman Numeral Eight	2177	8567
ⅸ	ix	9	Small Roman Numeral Nine	2178	8568
ⅹ	x	10	Small Roman Numeral Ten	2179	8569
ⅺ	xi	11	Small Roman Numeral Eleven	217A	8570
ⅻ	xii	12	Small Roman Numeral Twelve	217B	8571
ⅼ	l	50	Small Roman Numeral Fifty	217C	8572
ⅽ	c	100	Small Roman Numeral One Hundred	217D	8573
ⅾ	d	500	Small Roman Numeral Five Hundred	217E	8574
ⅿ	m	1000	Small Roman Numeral One Thousand	217F	8575
ↀ		1000	Roman Numeral One Thousand C D	2180	8576
ↁ		5000	Roman Numeral Five Thousand	2181	8577
ↂ		10000	Roman Numeral Ten Thousand	2182	8578
Ↄ		100	Roman Numeral Reversed One Hundred	2183	8579
ↄ		100	Latin Small Letter Reversed C	2184	8580
ↅ		6	Roman Numeral Six Late Form	2185	8581
ↆ		50	Roman Numeral Fifty Early Form	2186	8582
ↇ		50000	Roman Numeral Fifty Thousand	2187	8583
ↈ		100000	Roman Numeral One Hundred Thousand	2188	8584
↉	^{0}/_{3} or	0	Vulgar Fraction Zero Thirds (used in baseball scoring)	2189	8585
↊	2	10	Turned Digit Two (used in duodecimal)	218A	8586
↋	3	11	Turned Digit Three (used in duodecimal)	218B	8587

== Block ==
Number Forms^{[1]}^{[2]} Official Unicode Consortium code chart (PDF)
	0	1	2	3	4	5	6	7	8	9	A	B	C	D	E	F
U+215x	⅐	⅑	⅒	⅓	⅔	⅕	⅖	⅗	⅘	⅙	⅚	⅛	⅜	⅝	⅞	⅟
U+216x	Ⅰ	Ⅱ	Ⅲ	Ⅳ	Ⅴ	Ⅵ	Ⅶ	Ⅷ	Ⅸ	Ⅹ	Ⅺ	Ⅻ	Ⅼ	Ⅽ	Ⅾ	Ⅿ
U+217x	ⅰ	ⅱ	ⅲ	ⅳ	ⅴ	ⅵ	ⅶ	ⅷ	ⅸ	ⅹ	ⅺ	ⅻ	ⅼ	ⅽ	ⅾ	ⅿ
U+218x	ↀ	ↁ	ↂ	Ↄ	ↄ	ↅ	ↆ	ↇ	ↈ	↉	↊	↋				
Notes 1.As of Unicode version 17.0 2.Grey areas indicate non-assigned code points

== History ==
The following Unicode-related documents record the purpose and process of defining specific characters in the Number Forms block:

Version	Final code points (Note: Proposed code points and characters names may differ from final code points and names)	Count	L2 ID	WG2 ID	Document
1.0.0	U+2153..2182	48			(to be determined)
3.0	U+2183	1	L2/98-215	N1748	Everson, Michael (1998-05-25), Additional signature mark characters for the UCS
3.0	U+2183	1	L2/98-281R (pdf, html)		Aliprand, Joan (1998-07-31), "Signature Marks (IV.C.7)", Unconfirmed Minutes – UTC #77 & NCITS Subgroup L2 # 174 JOINT MEETING, Redmond, WA -- July 29-31, 1998
3.0	U+2183	1	L2/98-292R (pdf, html, Figure 1)		"2.7", Comments on proposals to add characters from ISO standards developed by ISO/TC 46/SC 4, 1998-08-19
3.0	U+2183	1	L2/98-292	N1840	"2.7", Comments on proposals to add characters from ISO standards developed by ISO/TC 46/SC 4, 1998-08-25
3.0	U+2183	1	L2/98-301	N1847	Everson, Michael (1998-09-12), Responses to NCITS/L2 and Unicode Consortium comments on numerous proposals
3.0	U+2183	1	L2/98-372	N1884R2 (pdf, doc)	Whistler, Ken; et al. (1998-09-22), Additional Characters for the UCS
3.0	U+2183	1	L2/98-329	N1920	Combined PDAM registration and consideration ballot on WD for ISO/IEC 10646-1/Amd. 30, AMENDMENT 30: Additional Latin and other characters, 1998-10-28
3.0	U+2183	1	L2/99-010	N1903 (pdf, html, doc)	Umamaheswaran, V. S. (1998-12-30), "8.1.5.1", Minutes of WG 2 meeting 35, London, U.K.; 1998-09-21--25
5.0	U+2184	1	L2/05-076		Davis, Mark (2005-02-10), Stability of Case Folding
5.0	U+2184	1	L2/05-183	N2957	Everson, Michael; Haugen, Odd Einar; Emiliano, António; Pedro, Susana; Grammel, Florian; Baker, Peter; Stötzner, Andreas; Dohnicht, Marcus; Luft, Diana (2005-08-02), Preliminary proposal to add medievalist characters to the UCS
5.0	U+2184	1	L2/05-191		Whistler, Ken (2005-08-02), Proposal for dealing with lowercase Claudian letters
5.0	U+2184	1	L2/05-193R2	N2960R	Everson, Michael (2005-08-12), Proposal to add Claudian Latin letters to the UCS
5.0	U+2184	1		N2942	Freytag, Asmus; Whistler, Ken (2005-08-12), Proposal to add nine lowercase characters
5.0	U+2184	1	L2/05-180		Moore, Lisa (2005-08-17), "Claudian (C.15)", UTC #104 Minutes
5.0	U+2184	1	L2/05-108R		Moore, Lisa (2005-08-26), "Stability of Case Folding (B.14.2)", UTC #103 Minutes
5.0	U+2184	1		N2953 (pdf, doc)	Umamaheswaran, V. S. (2006-02-16), "7.4.6, 8.2.3", Unconfirmed minutes of WG 2 meeting 47, Sophia Antipolis, France; 2005-09-12/15
5.1	U+2185..2188	4	L2/06-269	N3218	Perry, David J. (2006-08-01), Proposal to Add Additional Ancient Roman Characters to UCS
5.1	U+2185..2188	4	L2/06-324R2		Moore, Lisa (2006-11-29), "Consensus 109-C33", UTC #109 Minutes
5.1	U+2185..2188	4	L2/07-268	N3253 (pdf, doc)	Umamaheswaran, V. S. (2007-07-26), "M50.24", Unconfirmed minutes of WG 2 meeting 50, Frankfurt-am-Main, Germany; 2007-04-24/27
5.2	U+2150..2152, 2189	4		N3353 (pdf, doc)	Umamaheswaran, V. S. (2007-10-10), "M51.32", Unconfirmed minutes of WG 2 meeting 51 Hanzhou, China; 2007-04-24/27
5.2	U+2150..2152, 2189	4	L2/07-259		Suignard, Michel (2007-08-02), Japanese TV Symbols
5.2	U+2150..2152, 2189	4	L2/07-391	N3341	Suignard, Michel (2007-09-18), Japanese TV Symbols
5.2	U+2150..2152, 2189	4	L2/08-077R2	N3397	Suignard, Michel (2008-03-11), Japanese TV symbols
5.2	U+2150..2152, 2189	4	L2/08-128		Iancu, Laurențiu (2008-03-22), Names and allocation of some Japanese TV symbols from N3397
5.2	U+2150..2152, 2189	4	L2/08-158		Pentzlin, Karl (2008-04-16), Comments on L2/08-077R2 "Japanese TV Symbols"
5.2	U+2150..2152, 2189	4	L2/08-188	N3468	Sekiguchi, Masahiro (2008-04-22), Collected comments on Japanese TV Symbols (WG2 N3397)
5.2	U+2150..2152, 2189	4	L2/08-077R3	N3469	Suignard, Michel (2008-04-23), Japanese TV symbols
5.2	U+2150..2152, 2189	4	L2/08-215		Pentzlin, Karl (2008-05-07), Comments on L2/08-077R2 "Japanese TV Symbols"
5.2	U+2150..2152, 2189	4	L2/08-289		Pentzlin, Karl (2008-08-05), Proposal to rename and reassign some Japanese TV Symbols from L2/08-077R3
5.2	U+2150..2152, 2189	4	L2/08-292		Stötzner, Andreas (2008-08-06), Improvement suggestions for n3469
5.2	U+2150..2152, 2189	4	L2/08-307		Scherer, Markus (2008-08-08), Feedback on the Japanese TV Symbols Proposal (L2/08-077R3)
5.2	U+2150..2152, 2189	4	L2/08-318	N3453 (pdf, doc)	Umamaheswaran, V. S. (2008-08-13), "M52.14", Unconfirmed minutes of WG 2 meeting 52
5.2	U+2150..2152, 2189	4	L2/08-161R2		Moore, Lisa (2008-11-05), "Consensus 115-C17", UTC #115 Minutes, "Approve 186 Japanese TV symbols for encoding in a future version of the standard."
8.0	U+218A..218B	2	L2/13-054	N4399	Pentzlin, Karl (2013-03-30), Proposal to encode Duodecimal Digit Forms in the UCS
8.0	U+218A..218B	2	L2/13-086		Anderson, Deborah; McGowan, Rick; Whistler, Ken; Pournader, Roozbeh (2013-04-26), "1", Recommendations to UTC on Script Proposals
8.0	U+218A..218B	2	L2/13-058		Moore, Lisa (2013-06-12), "C.3", UTC #135 Minutes
8.0	U+218A..218B	2		N4403 (pdf, doc)	Umamaheswaran, V. S. (2014-01-28), "10.3.6 Duodecimal Digit forms", Unconfirmed minutes of WG 2 meeting 61, Holiday Inn, Vilnius, Lithuania; 2013-06-10/14

== See also ==
- Latin script in Unicode
- Unicode symbols
