= Numerals in Unicode =

Graphemes for various number systems

A numeral (often called number in Unicode) is a character that denotes a number. The decimal number digits 0–9 are used widely in various writing systems throughout the world, however the graphemes representing the decimal digits differ widely. Therefore Unicode includes 22 different sets of graphemes for the decimal digits, and also various decimal points, thousands separators, negative signs, etc. Unicode also includes several non-decimal numerals such as Aegean numerals, Roman numerals, counting rod numerals, Mayan numerals, Cuneiform numerals and ancient Greek numerals. There is also a large number of typographical variations of the Western Arabic numerals provided for specialized mathematical use and for compatibility with earlier character sets, such as ² or ②, and composite characters such as ½.

== Numerals by numeric property ==
Grouped by their numerical property as used in a text, Unicode has four values for Numeric Type. First there is the "not a number" type. Then there are decimal-radix numbers, commonly used in Western style decimals (plain 0–9), there are numbers that are not part of a decimal system such as Roman numbers, and decimal numbers in typographic context, such as encircled numbers. Not noted is a numbering like "A. B. C." for chapter numbering.

Numeric Type^{[a]}^{[b]} (Unicode character property)
Numeric type	Code	Has numeric value	Example	Remarks
Not numeric	<none>	No	A; X (Latin); !; Д; μ; に	Numeric Value="NaN"
Decimal	De	Yes	0; 1; 9; ६ (Devanagari 6); ೬ (Kannada 6); 𝟨 (Mathematical, styled sans serif)	Straight digit (decimal-radix). Corresponds both ways with General Category=Nd^{[a]}
Digit	Di	Yes	¹ (superscript); ①; ⒈ (digit with full stop)	Decimal, but in typographic context
Numeric	Nu	Yes	¾; ௰ (Tamil number ten); Ⅹ (Roman numeral); 六 (Han number 6)	Numeric value, but not decimal-radix
a. "Section 4.6: Numeric Value". The Unicode Standard. Unicode Consortium. September 2025.
b. "Unicode Derived Numeric Types". Unicode Character Database. Unicode Consortium. 2025-06-30.

== Hexadecimal digits ==
Hexadecimal digits in Unicode are not separate characters; existing letters and numbers are used. These characters have marked Character properties Hex_digit=Yes, and ASCII_Hex_digit=Yes when appropriate.

Characters in Unicode marked Hex_Digit=Yes^{[a]}
0123456789ABCDEF	Basic Latin, capitals	Also ASCII_Hex_Digit=Yes
0123456789abcdef	Basic Latin, small letters	Also ASCII_Hex_Digit=Yes
０１２３４５６７８９ＡＢＣＤＥＦ	Fullwidth forms, capitals	
０１２３４５６７８９ａｂｃｄｅｆ	Fullwidth forms, small letters	
a. "Unicode 17.0 UCD: PropList.txt". 2025-06-30.

== Numerals by script ==
=== Digits ===
Unicode includes the Western Arabic numerals in the Basic Latin (or ASCII derived) block. Other forms of the ten digits are in several other scripts: Eastern Arabic, Balinese, Bengali, Devanagari, Ethiopic, Gujarati, Gurmukhi, Telugu, Khmer, Lao, Limbu, Malayalam, Mongolian, Myanmar, New Tai Lue, Nko, Oriya, Telugu, Thai, Tibetan, Osmanya. Unicode includes a numeric value property for each digit to assist in collation and other text processing operations. However, there is no mapping between the various related digits.

Although Arabic and some other languages are written right to left, numbers in most languages are written with the most significant digit on the left and the least significant on the right. The Unicode characters have direction properties so they are written left to right and thus the most significant digit should be first in a text file no matter what language is used.

The digits can be reused for bases less than 10, but letters or other characters must be used for hexadecimal or any other base larger than 10. These characters lack the numeric value property.

==== Fractions ====
The U+2044 / FRACTION SLASH allows authors using Unicode to compose any arbitrary fraction along with the decimal digits. This was intended to instruct font rendering to make the surrounding digits smaller and raise them on the left and lower them on the right, but this is rarely implemented. (A workaround is to use the super/subscript characters described below, but only Arabic numerals are available.) Unicode also includes a handful of vulgar fractions as compatibility characters, but discourages their use.

==== Decimal fractions ====
Several characters in Unicode can serve as a decimal separator depending on the locale. Decimal fractions are represented in text as a sequence of decimal digit numerals with a decimal separator separating the whole-number portion from the fractional portion. For example, the decimal fraction for ¼ is expressed as zero-point-two-five ("0.25"). Unicode has no dedicated general decimal separator but unifies the decimal separator function with other punctuation characters. So the "." used in "0.25" is the same period character (U+002E) used to end the sentence. However, cultures vary in the glyph or grapheme used for a decimal separator. So in some locales, the comma (U+002C) may be used instead: "0,25". Still other locales use a space (or non-breaking space) for "0 25". The Arabic writing system includes a dedicated character for a decimal separator that looks much like a comma, U+066B ٫ ARABIC DECIMAL SEPARATOR, which when combined with the Arabic digits to express one-quarter appears as: "٠٫٢٥".

==== Characters for mathematical constants ====
Currently, three Unicode characters semantically represent mathematical constants: U+210E ℎ PLANCK CONSTANT, the U+210F ℏ PLANCK CONSTANT OVER TWO PI, and U+2107 ℇ EULER CONSTANT (of unknown significance). Other mathematical constants can be represented using characters that have multiple semantic uses. For example, although Unicode includes a character for natural exponent ℯ (U+212F) its UCS canonical name derives from its glyph: U+212F ℯ SCRIPT SMALL E; and the mathematical constant π, 3.141592.., is represented by U+03C0 π GREEK SMALL LETTER PI.

==== Rich text and other compatibility numerals ====
The Western Arabic numerals also appear among the compatibility characters as rich text variant forms including bold, double-struck, monospace, sans-serif and sans-serif bold, along with fullwidth variants for legacy vertical text support.

Rich text parenthesized, circled and other variants are also included in the blocks Enclosed CJK Letters and Months; Enclosed Alphanumerics; Enclosed Alphanumeric Supplement; Superscripts and Subscripts; Number Forms; and Dingbats.

=== Suzhou (huāmǎ/Sūzhōu mǎzi) numerals ===
The huāmǎ (simplified Chinese: 花码; traditional Chinese: 花碼)/Sūzhōu mǎzi (simplified Chinese: 苏州码子; traditional Chinese: 蘇州碼字) system is a variation of the rod numeral system. Rod numerals are closely related to the counting rods and the abacus, which is why the numeric symbols for 1, 2, 3, 6, 7 and 8 in the huāmǎ system are represented in a similar way as on the abacus. Nowadays, the huāmǎ system is only used for displaying prices in Chinese markets or on traditional handwritten invoices.

The digits of the Suzhou numerals are in the CJK Symbols and Punctuation block at U+3021—U+3029, U+3007, U+5341, U+5344, and U+5345. In Unicode 3.0 these characters are incorrectly called Hangzhou style numerals. In the Unicode 4.0, an erratum was added which stated:

The Suzhou numerals (Chinese su1zhou1ma3zi) are special numeric forms used by traders to display the prices of goods. The use of "HANGZHOU" in the names is a misnomer.

All references to "Hangzhou" in the Unicode standard have been corrected to "Suzhou" except for the character names themselves, which cannot be changed once assigned, according to the Unicode Stability Policy. (This policy allows software to use the names as unique identifiers.)

=== Ancient Greek numerals ===
Unicode provides support for several variants of Greek numerals, assigned to the Supplementary Multilingual Plane from U+10140 through U+1018F.

Attic numerals were used by ancient Greeks, possibly from the 7th century BC. They were also known as Herodianic numerals because they were first described in a 2nd-century manuscript by Herodian. They are also known as acrophonic numerals because all of the symbols used derive from the first letters of the words that the symbols represent: 'one', 'five', 'ten', 'hundred', 'thousand' and 'ten thousand'. See Greek numerals and acrophony.

Decimal	Symbol	Greek numeral
1	Ι	ἴος or ἰός (ios)
5	Π	πέντε ('pente)
10	Δ	δέκα (deka)
100	Η	ἑκατόν ('hekaton)
1000	Χ	χίλιοι (khilioi)
10000	Μ	μύριοι (myrioi)

Ancient Greek Numbers^{[1]}^{[2]} Official Unicode Consortium code chart (PDF)
	0	1	2	3	4	5	6	7	8	9	A	B	C	D	E	F
U+1014x	𐅀	𐅁	𐅂	𐅃	𐅄	𐅅	𐅆	𐅇	𐅈	𐅉	𐅊	𐅋	𐅌	𐅍	𐅎	𐅏
U+1015x	𐅐	𐅑	𐅒	𐅓	𐅔	𐅕	𐅖	𐅗	𐅘	𐅙	𐅚	𐅛	𐅜	𐅝	𐅞	𐅟
U+1016x	𐅠	𐅡	𐅢	𐅣	𐅤	𐅥	𐅦	𐅧	𐅨	𐅩	𐅪	𐅫	𐅬	𐅭	𐅮	𐅯
U+1017x	𐅰	𐅱	𐅲	𐅳	𐅴	𐅵	𐅶	𐅷	𐅸	𐅹	𐅺	𐅻	𐅼	𐅽	𐅾	𐅿
U+1018x	𐆀	𐆁	𐆂	𐆃	𐆄	𐆅	𐆆	𐆇	𐆈	𐆉	𐆊	𐆋	𐆌	𐆍	𐆎	
Notes 1.As of Unicode version 17.0 2.Grey area indicates non-assigned code point

=== Roman numerals ===
Roman numerals originated in ancient Rome, adapted from Etruscan numerals. The system used in classical antiquity was slightly modified in the Middle Ages to produce the system we use today. It is based on certain letters which are given values as numerals.

Roman numerals are commonly used today in numbered lists (in outline format), clockfaces, pages preceding the main body of a book, chord triads in music analysis (Roman numeral analysis), the numbering of movie and video game sequels, book publication dates, successive political leaders or children with identical names, and the numbering of some sport events, such as the Olympic Games or the Super Bowl.

Unicode has a number of characters specifically designated as Roman numerals, as part of the Number Forms range from U+2160 to U+2188. This range includes both upper- and lowercase numerals, as well as pre-combined characters for numbers up to 12 (XII). One reason for the existence of pre-combined numbers is to facilitate the setting of multiple-letter numbers (such as VIII) on a single horizontal line in Asian vertical text. The Unicode standard, however, includes special Roman numeral code points for compatibility only, stating that "[f]or most purposes, it is preferable to compose the Roman numerals from sequences of the appropriate Latin letters".

Additionally, characters exist for archaic forms of 1000, 5000, 10,000, large reversed C (Ɔ), late 6 (ↅ, similar to Greek Stigma: Ϛ), early 50 (ↆ, similar to down arrow ↓⫝⊥), 50,000, and 100,000. The small reversed c, ↄ, is not intended to be used in Roman numerals, but as lower case Claudian letter Ↄ.

Table of Roman numerals in Unicode
	0	1	2	3	4	5	6	7	8	9	A	B	C	D	E	F
Value	1	2	3	4	5	6	7	8	9	10	11	12	50	100	500	1,000
U+216x	Ⅰ	Ⅱ	Ⅲ	Ⅳ	Ⅴ	Ⅵ	Ⅶ	Ⅷ	Ⅸ	Ⅹ	Ⅺ	Ⅻ	Ⅼ	Ⅽ	Ⅾ	Ⅿ
U+217x	ⅰ	ⅱ	ⅲ	ⅳ	ⅴ	ⅵ	ⅶ	ⅷ	ⅸ	ⅹ	ⅺ	ⅻ	ⅼ	ⅽ	ⅾ	ⅿ

	0	1	2	3	4	5	6	7	8
Value	1000	5000	10,000	100	100	6	50	50,000	100,000
U+218x	ↀ	ↁ	ↂ	Ↄ	ↄ	ↅ	ↆ	ↇ	ↈ

If using blackletter or script typefaces, Roman numerals are set in Roman type. Such typefaces may contain Roman numerals matching the style of the typeface in the Unicode range U+2160–217F; if they don't exist, a matching Antiqua typeface is used for Roman numerals.

Unicode has characters for Roman fractions in the Ancient Symbols block: sextans, uncia, semuncia, sextula, dimidia sextula, siliqua, and as.

=== Counting rod numerals ===
Counting rod numerals are included in their own block in the Supplementary Multilingual Plane (SMP) as of Unicode 5.0. There are nine "horizontal" digits (U+1D360 to U+1D368) and nine "vertical" digits (U+1D369 to U+1D371), the horizontal digits are used for odd powers of ten and the vertical digits for even powers of ten. Zero should be represented by U+3007 (〇, ideographic number zero) and the negative sign should be represented by U+20E5 (combining reverse solidus overlay). This block also contains other counting-rod-like symbols, such as the well-known tally mark for 5 ~~||||~~. As these were recently added to the character set and are not in the BMP, font support may still be limited.

Counting Rod Numerals^{[1]}^{[2]} Official Unicode Consortium code chart (PDF)
	0	1	2	3	4	5	6	7	8	9	A	B	C	D	E	F
U+1D36x	𝍠	𝍡	𝍢	𝍣	𝍤	𝍥	𝍦	𝍧	𝍨	𝍩	𝍪	𝍫	𝍬	𝍭	𝍮	𝍯
U+1D37x	𝍰	𝍱	𝍲	𝍳	𝍴	𝍵	𝍶	𝍷	𝍸							
Notes 1.As of Unicode version 17.0 2.Grey areas indicate non-assigned code points

== See also ==
- Number Forms (Unicode block)
