= Code page 932 =

Code page 932 or CP932 can refer to either of two variants of Shift JIS:

- Code page 932 (IBM)
- Code page 932 (Microsoft Windows)
