= We (kana) =

we

Hiragana	Katakana
- Transliteration: e, we
- Hiragana origin: 恵
- Katakana origin: 恵
- Man'yōgana: 廻 恵 面 咲
- Spelling kana: かぎのあるヱ; Kagi no aru "e"
- Unicode: U+3091, U+30F1
- Braille: ⠖

We (hiragana: ゑ, katakana: ヱ) is an obsolete kana (Japanese phonetic character) that is pronounced [e] (same pronunciation as e (kana): え) in current-day Japanese.

It is presumed that 'ゑ' represented [we], while ゑ and え indicated different pronunciations until somewhere between the Kamakura and Taishō periods, when they both came to be pronounced as 'いぇ' [je], later shifting to the modern 'え' [e]. The combination of ゑ or ヱ with dakuten (ゑ゙ ヹ) were introduced to represent [ve] in the 19th and 20th centuries. Along with the kana for wi ('ゐ' in hiragana, 'ヰ' in katakana), this kana was deemed obsolete in Japanese in 1946 and replaced with え and エ. It is now rare in everyday usage; in onomatopoeia or foreign words, the katakana form 'ウェ' (U-[small-e]) is used, as in "ウェスト" for "west".

The kana still sees some modern-day usage as a stylistic variant of 'え/エ'. Ebisu is usually written as "えびす", but sometimes "ゑびす" like Kyoto Ebisu Shrine (京都ゑびす神社, Kyōto Webisu Jinja), and name of the beer Yebisu (ヱビス), which is actually pronounced "Ebisu". The Japanese title of the Rebuild of Evangelion series is Evangelion: New Theatrical Edition (ヱヴァンゲリヲン新劇場版, Evangerion Shin Gekijōban) which stylistically substitutes エ and オ with ヱ and ヲ. VTuber Sakamata Chloe (沙花叉クロヱ, Sakamata Kurowe) of Hololive Production uses ヱ (we) instead of the エ (e) standardly used for spelling the name Chloe (クロエ, Kuroe). Katakana ヱ is sometimes written with a dakuten, ヹ, to represent a /ve/ sound in foreign words; however, most commonly used Japanese IMEs lack a convenient way to write this, and the digraph ヴェ is far more common. The Meiji-era Classical Japanese version of the Bible renders Jehovah as ヱホバ (Yehoba), and ヱ (ye) is also used to transcribe any Hebrew name spelled with Je in English (pronounced "ye" in Hebrew, though), such as Jephthah (ヱフタ, Yefuta); the modern Japanese version, on the other hand, only uses エ (e), hence エホバ (Ehoba) and エフタ (Efuta).

Hiragana ゑ is still used in several Okinawan orthographies for the mora /we/. In the Ryūkyū University system, ゑ is also combined with a small ぃ (ゑぃ/ヱィ), to represent the sound /wi/. Katakana ヱ is used in Ainu for /we/.

In wāpuro rōmaji, the string of letters used for input to produce ゑ or ヱ, the sequence is wye.

== Stroke order ==
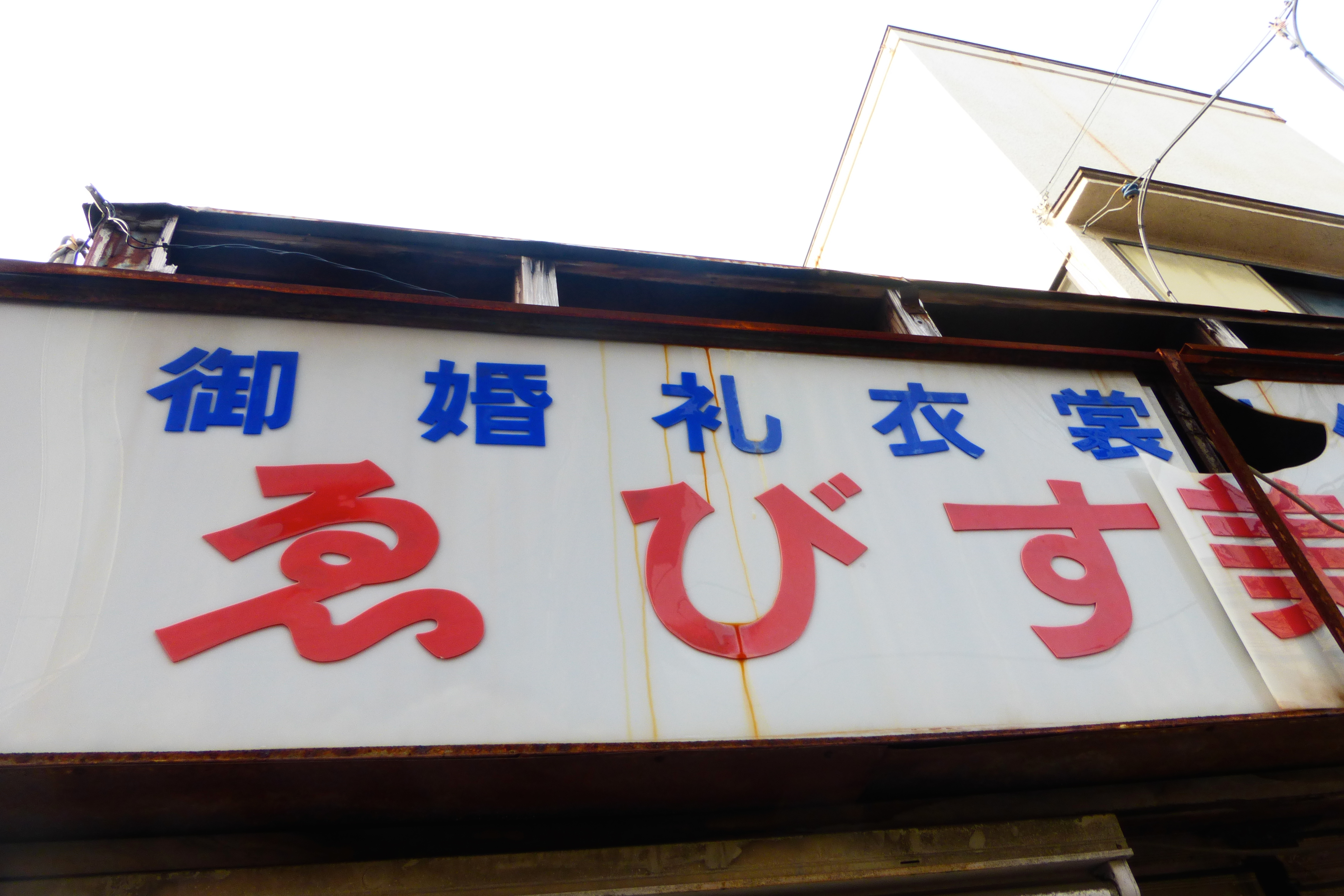
Sign in Tokyo reading ゑびす (Ebisu) in hiragana with ゑ for e

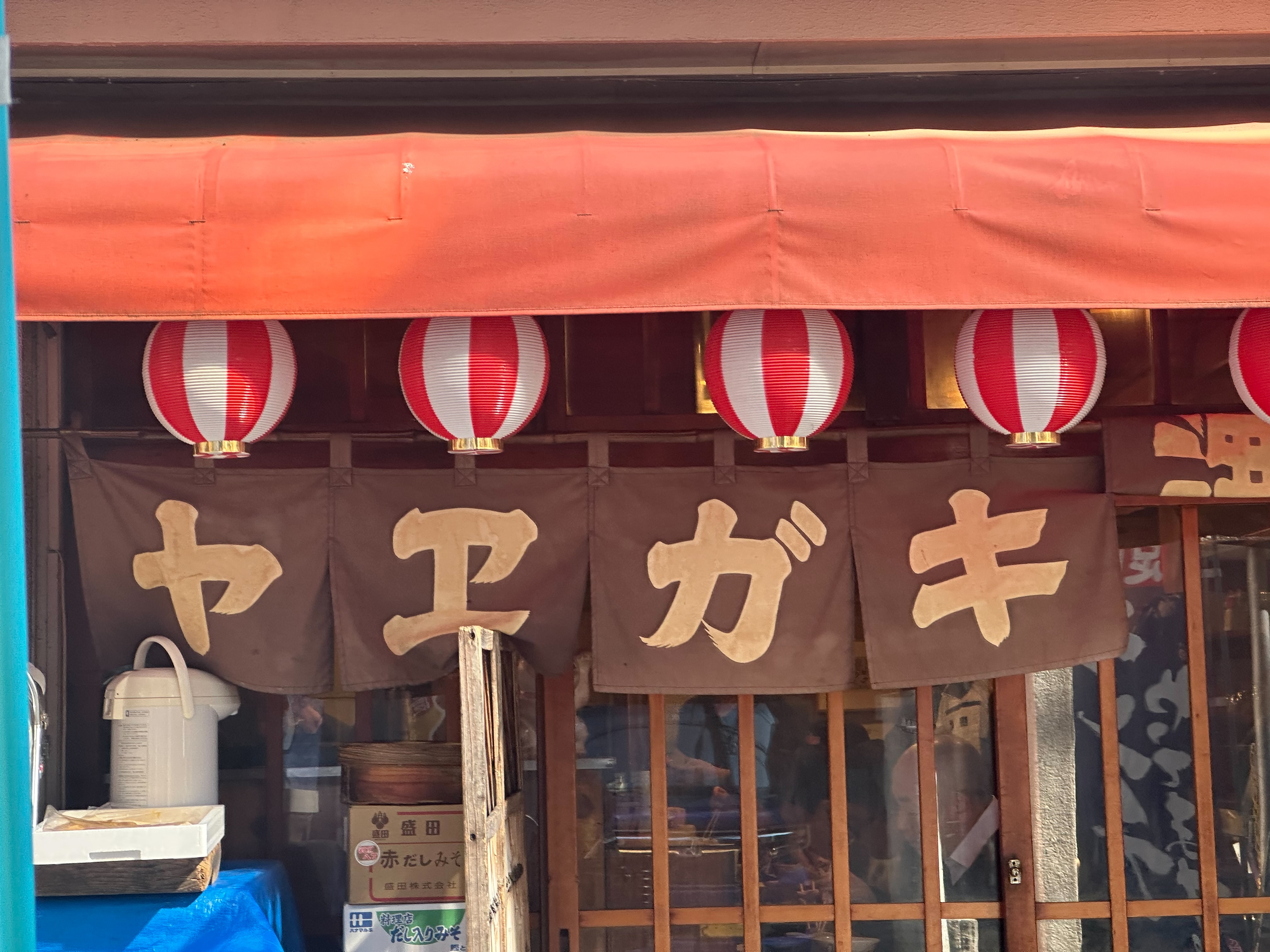
Curtain sign in Tokyo reading ヤヱガキ (Yaegaki) in katakana with ヱ for e

Stroke order of both ゑ and ヱ
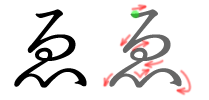
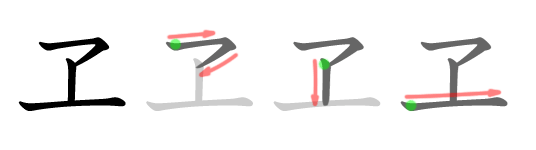
Animated	Diagram
Stroke order in writing ゑ	Stroke order in writing ゑ
Stroke order in writing ヱ	Stroke order in writing ヱ

The hiragana ゑ is made with one stroke. It resembles a hiragana る that continues with a double-humped ん shape underneath.

The katakana ヱ is made with three strokes:

1. A horizontal line that hooks down and to the left.
2. A centered vertical line, just grazing the end of the first stroke.
3. A horizontal line across the bottom, slightly longer than the first line.

== Other communicative representations ==
Japanese radiotelephony alphabet	Wabun code
かぎのあるヱ; Kagi no aru "We"	▄ ▄▄▄ ▄▄▄ ▄ ▄

Japanese Navy Signal Flag

Japanese semaphore

Japanese manual syllabary (fingerspelling)
Braille dots-235
Japanese Braille

=== Braille forms ===
ゑ / ヱ in Japanese Braille
ゑ / ヱ (w)e	ヹ ve	ゑい / ヱー (w)ei/(w)ē	ヹー vē
⠖ (braille pattern dots-235)	⠐ (braille pattern dots-5) ⠖ (braille pattern dots-235)	⠖ (braille pattern dots-235) ⠒ (braille pattern dots-25)	⠐ (braille pattern dots-5) ⠖ (braille pattern dots-235) ⠒ (braille pattern dots-25)

=== Computer encodings ===
Character information
Preview	ゑ		ヱ		𛅑		𛅥	
Unicode name	HIRAGANA LETTER WE		KATAKANA LETTER WE		HIRAGANA LETTER SMALL WE		KATAKANA LETTER SMALL WE	
Encodings	decimal	hex	dec	hex	dec	hex	dec	hex
Unicode	12433	U+3091	12529	U+30F1	110929	U+1B151	110949	U+1B165
UTF-8	227 130 145	E3 82 91	227 131 177	E3 83 B1	240 155 133 145	F0 9B 85 91	240 155 133 165	F0 9B 85 A5
UTF-16	12433	3091	12529	30F1	55340 56657	D82C DD51	55340 56677	D82C DD65
Numeric character reference	&#12433;	&#x3091;	&#12529;	&#x30F1;	&#110929;	&#x1B151;	&#110949;	&#x1B165;
Shift JIS	130 239	82 EF	131 145	83 91				
EUC-JP	164 241	A4 F1	165 241	A5 F1				
GB 18030	164 241	A4 F1	165 241	A5 F1			147 54 134 51	93 36 86 33
EUC-KR / UHC	170 241	AA F1	171 241	AB F1				
Big5 (non-ETEN kana)	198 245	C6 F5	199 171	C7 AB				
Big5 (ETEN / HKSCS)	199 120	C7 78	199 237	C7 ED				

Character information
Preview	ヹ		㋽	
Unicode name	KATAKANA LETTER VE		CIRCLED KATAKANA WE	
Encodings	decimal	hex	dec	hex
Unicode	12537	U+30F9	13053	U+32FD
UTF-8	227 131 185	E3 83 B9	227 139 189	E3 8B BD
Numeric character reference	&#12537;	&#x30F9;	&#13053;	&#x32FD;
Shift JIS (KanjiTalk 7)	136 108	88 6C		
Shift JIS (JIS X 0213)	132 148	84 94		
EUC-JP (JIS X 0213)	167 244	A7 F4		
GB 18030	129 57 167 55	81 39 A7 37		

== See also ==
- U (kana)
- E (kana)
