= Wave dash =

East Asian character primarily used to represent a range

〜o

Wave dash
- In Unicode: U+301C 〜 WAVE DASH

Wave dash (U+301C 〜 WAVE DASH) is a character represented in Japanese character encoding mainly used as a dash and chōonpu. The wave dash is similar to, but not the same as, the tilde character (U+FF5E ～ FULLWIDTH TILDE), which is often used interchangeably with it.

The vertical wave dash is not currently included in Unicode, but there is a similar symbol available called the wavy line (U+2307 ⌇ WAVY LINE). It is created by rotating right (clockwise) the wavy dash symbol (U+3030 〰 WAVY DASH) to form a vertical wave-like pattern.

Wave dash is also written in vertical text layout. Vertical wave dash is the vertical form by rotation and flip in Unicode and JIS C 6226.

== Code reference ==
Wave dash in Character sets standards
Standard	Release	Code-Point Ku-Ten / Ku-Men-Ten	Glyph	Note
Unicode 1.0	1991	U+301C WAVE DASH		The glyph was different from the original JIS C 6226 or JIS X 0208.
Unicode 8.0	2015	U+301C WAVE DASH		The glyph was fixed in Errata fixed in Unicode 8.0.0, The Unicode Consortium, 6 Oct 2014
JIS C 6226	1978	1-33		The wave was not stressed this much.
JIS X 0208	1990	1-33		
JIS X 0213	2000	1-1-33		

Wave dash in each encoding
Encode	code	Note
ISO 2022-JP	0x2141	
Shift JIS	0x8160	
EUC-JP	0xA1C1	(= 0x2141 + 0x8080)
UTF-8	0xE3809C	

== See also ==
- Dash § Swung dash
- Tilde § Unicode and Shift JIS encoding of wave dash
- Japanese punctuation § Wave dash
