= Wi (kana) =

wi

Hiragana	Katakana
- Transliteration: i, wi
- Hiragana origin: 爲
- Katakana origin: 井
- Man'yōgana: 位 為 謂 井 猪 藍 爲
- Spelling kana: ゐどのヰ ido no "i"
- Unicode: U+3090, U+30F0
- Braille: ⠆

Wi (hiragana: ゐ, katakana: ヰ) is an obsolete kana (Japanese phonetic character) that is normally pronounced [i] (the same as the kana for i) in current-day Japanese.

It is presumed that 'ゐ' represented [wi], and that 'ゐ' and 'い' represented distinct pronunciations before merging to [i] sometime between the Kamakura and Taishō periods. The combination of a W-column kana letter with dakuten to create ゐ゙ and ヸ in hiragana and katakana was introduced to represent [vi] in the 19th century and 20th century. Along with the kana for we ('ゑ' in hiragana, 'ヱ' in katakana), this kana was deemed obsolete in Japanese with the orthographic reforms of 1946, to be replaced by 'い/イ' in all contexts. It is now rare in everyday usage; in onomatopoeia and foreign words, the katakana form 'ウィ' (U-[small-i]) is used for the mora /wi/.

However, the kana still sees some modern-day usage as a stylistic variant of 'い/イ'. The spelling of whisky is usually uisukii ("ウイスキー"), but is sometimes written ("ウヰスキー") stylistically with a ヰ for i, such as Nikka Whisky (ニッカウヰスキー, nikka uisukī). The name of the comedy duo Yoiko (よゐこ) is written with a ゐ for the i, and the first opening theme to the Future Diary anime series is titled "空想メソロギヰ" (Kūsō Mesorogī) using a ヰ for i. Two characters in the video game series Touhou Project have "ゐ" in their names: Tewi Inaba (因幡 てゐ; pronounced Inaba Tei) and Tenshi Hinanawi (比那名居 天子; pronounced Hinanai Tenshi). The katakana ヰ is sometimes written with a dakuten, 'ヸ', to represent a /vi/ sound in foreign words; however, most IMEs lack a convenient way to do this. It is far more common for /vi/ to be represented by the digraph ヴィ.

Hiragana 'ゐ' is still used in one of the Okinawan orthographies, New Okinawan, for the mora /wi/ and in digraphs for /kwi, ɡwi/. In the Ryukyu University system, the katakana 'ヰ' is used for /i/, while 'い' is /ʔi/. The katakana 'ヰ' is also used in Ainu for /wi/.

In wāpuro rōmaji—that is, the string of letters used for input to produce ゐ or ヰ—the sequence is wyi.

== History ==
=== Nara period (710–794 AD) ===
During the Nara period, ヰ was pronounced as [wi] and イ as [i]. In the Man'yōgana, there were characters to represent ヰ (e.g. 井, 位, 爲, 猪, 謂, 藍) and イ (e.g. 已, 五, 以, 伊, 怡, 射, 移, 異); no characters for one could be used to pronounce the other. The labial glides クヰ [kʷi] and グヰ [gʷi] also existed (though in those days small script kana were not used for glides), and were distinct from キ [ki] and ギ [gi].

=== Heian Period (794–1184 AD) ===
During the Heian period, ゐ and い were still recognized as separately pronounced characters. In the mid-to-late 11th century, the Iroha song was developed, and い, え, and お (i, e, and o) were differentiated from ゐ, ゑ, and を (wi, we, and wo). In the Gojūon ordering (developed around 1075 by the scholar Hirotomo, based on the Siddhaṃ script), there were no sounds for “yi”, “ye”, “wu”, or “wo”. Although the distinction had been lost between オ (o) and ヲ (wo) as well as エ (e) and 𛀀 (ye), there was still a distinction between ア/ワ (a/wa), イ/ヰ (i/wi), and エ/ヱ (e/we).

In Ki no Tsurayuki's literary work, the Tosa Nikki (originally written in 935, transcribed in 1236), the phrase “海賊報いせむ” (kaizoku mukui semu) is written as “かいぞくむくゐせむ” (kaizoku mukuwi semu), with ゐ where い should be. In this way, examples of confusion between ゐ and い were emerging, little by little; however, during the Heian period these confusions were few and far between.

Since the Nara period, /h/ began to be pronounced as [w] in word-medial position; by the beginning of the 11th century, this phenomenon, called the "Ha-line shift", had become more widespread. In word-medial or word-final position, ひ [ɸi] would be pronounced [wi], therefore becoming the same as ゐ. Because of this, the use of ひ and ゐ also became confused.

At the end of the 12th century, the literary work “Shinkyō Shiki Chū” (which contained katakana, from the last years of the Insei period) attests examples of ゐ and い losing their distinction, such as “率て” (wite) being written “イテ” (ite).

Furthermore, in Heian period literature, special kanji readings such as “クヰヤウ” [kʷʲau] and “ヰヤウ” [wʲau] were used, but were not well established.

=== Kamakura Period (1185–1333 AD) ===
By the Kamakura period, the confusion between ゐ and い had become even more widespread, and by the 13th century, ゐ and い were unified. By changing from [wi] to [i], ゐ had merged into い. Also, kanji that were represented by クヰ and グヰ had become pronounced [ki] and [gi] respectively, merging them with キ and ギ.

Due to the Ha-line shift as well as the merging of a number of morae, soon there were many kana pronounced the same way, and kana orthography was in chaos. Fujiwara no Teika (1162–1241), in the “Unpleasant Characters” (嫌文字事) section of Gekanshū (a poetry volume), established rules for about 60 words containing を/お, え/へ/ゑ, and い/ひ/ゐ, based on a number of writings from the mid-11th to 12th century. However, the books that Teika had referenced already contained a number of confusions, with ひ becoming ゐ, such as 遂 (formerly “つひ” tsuhi) being represented as “つゐ” (tsuwi) and 宵 (formerly “よひ” yohi) being represented as “よゐ” (yowi); い becoming either ひ or ゐ, such as 老い (historically “おい” oi) being represented as “おゐ” (owi) or “おひ” (ohi); and various other spellings differing from their original pronunciation. Teika's syllabary particularly drew from poetry such as waka and renga, but a number of examples of confusion between い, ゐ, and word-medial/final ひ were also frequently pulled from other sources.

=== Muromachi Period (1333–1573 AD) ===
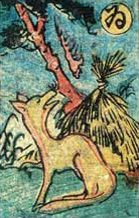
Karuta card, 19th century, bearing the ゐ character.

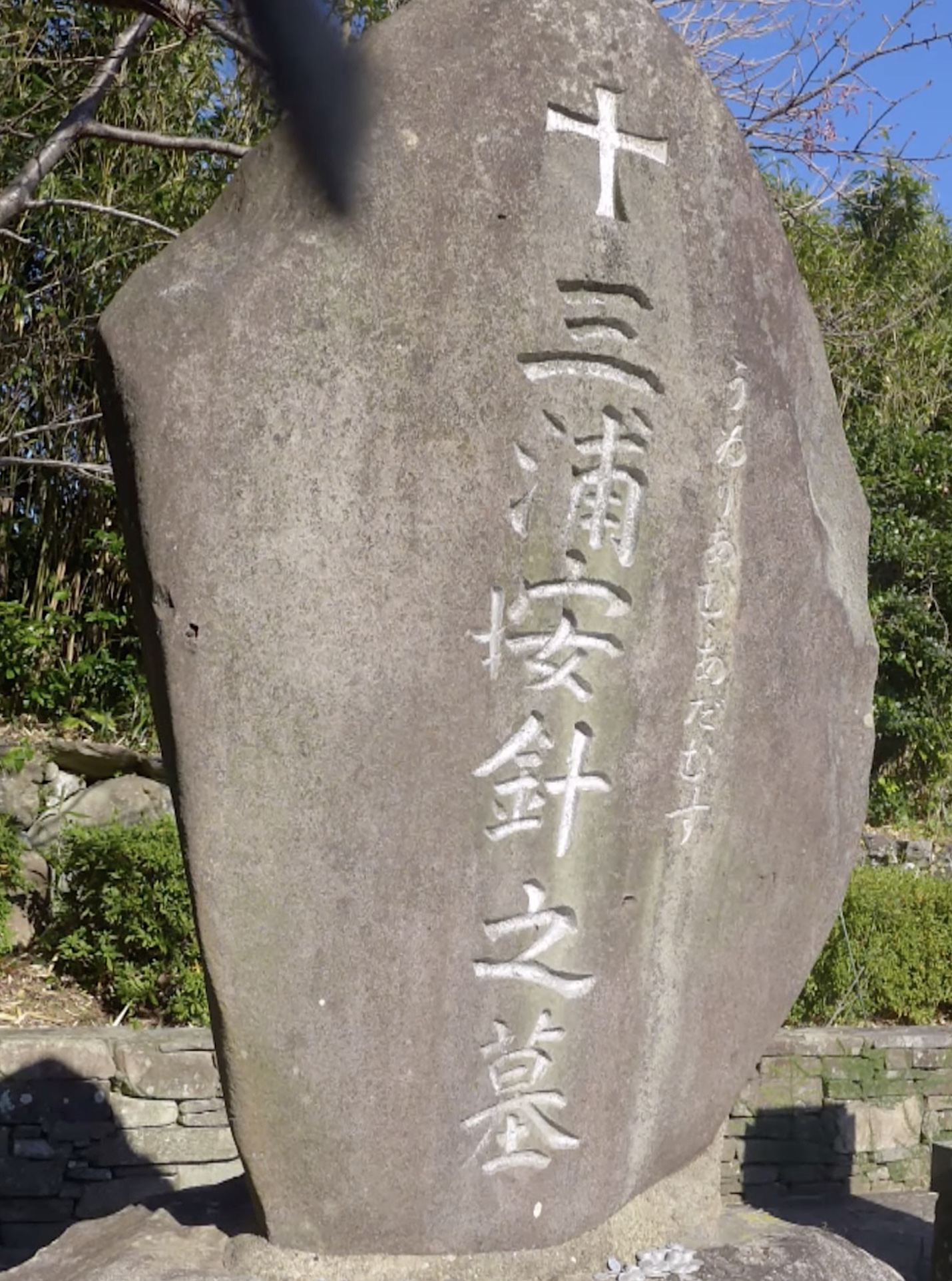
Grave of William Adams; his name is spelled using the ゐ kana (smaller text at right).

In the Nanboku-chō period, the scholar Gyōa published the Kanamojizukai (Kana Character Syllabary, completed in 1363), drastically augmenting the lexicon by over 1000 words. Though the Kanamojizukai was generally as widely accepted as Teika's syllabary, in practice there were a number of kana pronunciations that did not conform to it.

In Christian rōmaji documents from the 16th century (the later part of the Muromachi period), ゐ and い were written with either “i”, “j”, or “y”, but the pronunciation was understood to be [i] in any case.

== Stroke order ==
Stroke order in writing ゐ

Stroke order in writing ヰ

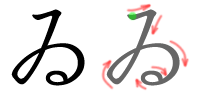
Stroke order in writing あ

The Hiragana ゐ is made with one stroke. It resembles the second stroke of the Hiragana ぬ, with an additional short horizontal line at the start.

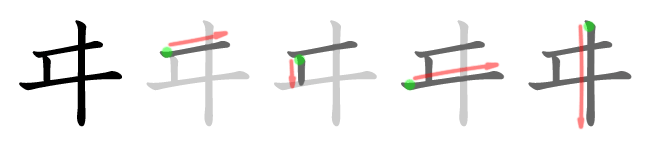
Stroke order in writing ヰ

The Katakana ヰ is made with four strokes:

1. A horizontal line.
2. A vertical line.
3. A horizontal line.
4. A vertical line.

== Other communicative representations ==
Japanese radiotelephony alphabet	Wabun code
ゐどのヰ; Ido no "I"	▄ ▄▄▄ ▄ ▄ ▄▄▄

Japanese Navy Signal Flag

Japanese semaphore

Japanese manual syllabary (fingerspelling)
Braille dots-23
Japanese Braille

=== Braille forms ===
ゐ / ヰ in Japanese Braille
ゐ / ヰ (w)i	ヸ vi	ゐい / ヰー (w)ī	ヸー vī
⠆ (braille pattern dots-23)	⠐ (braille pattern dots-5) ⠆ (braille pattern dots-23)	⠆ (braille pattern dots-23) ⠒ (braille pattern dots-25)	⠐ (braille pattern dots-5) ⠆ (braille pattern dots-23) ⠒ (braille pattern dots-25)

=== Computer encodings ===
Character information
Preview	ゐ		ヰ		𛅐		𛅤	
Unicode name	HIRAGANA LETTER WI		KATAKANA LETTER WI		HIRAGANA LETTER SMALL WI		KATAKANA LETTER SMALL WI	
Encodings	decimal	hex	dec	hex	dec	hex	dec	hex
Unicode	12432	U+3090	12528	U+30F0	110928	U+1B150	110948	U+1B164
UTF-8	227 130 144	E3 82 90	227 131 176	E3 83 B0	240 155 133 144	F0 9B 85 90	240 155 133 164	F0 9B 85 A4
UTF-16	12432	3090	12528	30F0	55340 56656	D82C DD50	55340 56676	D82C DD64
Numeric character reference	&#12432;	&#x3090;	&#12528;	&#x30F0;	&#110928;	&#x1B150;	&#110948;	&#x1B164;
Shift JIS	130 238	82 EE	131 144	83 90				
EUC-JP	164 240	A4 F0	165 240	A5 F0				
GB 18030	164 240	A4 F0	165 240	A5 F0			147 54 134 50	93 36 86 32
EUC-KR / UHC	170 240	AA F0	171 240	AB F0				
Big5 (non-ETEN kana)	198 244	C6 F4	199 170	C7 AA				
Big5 (ETEN / HKSCS)	199 119	C7 77	199 236	C7 EC				

Character information
Preview	ヸ		㋼	
Unicode name	KATAKANA LETTER VI		CIRCLED KATAKANA WI	
Encodings	decimal	hex	dec	hex
Unicode	12536	U+30F8	13052	U+32FC
UTF-8	227 131 184	E3 83 B8	227 139 188	E3 8B BC
Numeric character reference	&#12536;	&#x30F8;	&#13052;	&#x32FC;
Shift JIS (KanjiTalk 7)			136 107	88 6B
Shift JIS (JIS X 0213)			132 147	84 93
EUC-JP (JIS X 0213)			167 243	A7 F3
GB 18030	147 54 132 50	93 36 84 32	129 57 167 54	81 39 A7 36

==== Archaic forms ====
A second katakana wi, the kanji 井 used as a kana, was common alongside ヰ in Meiji-period textbooks and dictionaries, with attestations into the 1930s, and appears in the historical Nikka Whisky brand. Unicode 18.0 (September 2026) encoded it as U+1B128 KATAKANA LETTER ALTERNATE WI.

Character information
Preview	𛄨	
Unicode name	KATAKANA LETTER ALTERNATE WI	
Encodings	decimal	hex
Unicode	110888	U+1B128
UTF-8	240 155 132 168	F0 9B 84 A8
UTF-16	55340 56616	D82C DD28
Numeric character reference	&#110888;	&#x1B128;

== See also ==
- U (kana)
- I (kana)
