= Code page 932 (IBM) =

Computer character set for Japanese

IBM code page 932 (abbreviated as IBM-932 or ambiguously as CP932) is one of IBM's extensions of Shift JIS. The coded character sets are JIS X 0201:1976, JIS X 0208:1983, IBM extensions and IBM extensions for IBM 1880 UDC. It is the combination of the single-byte Code page 897 and the double-byte Code page 301. Code page 301 is designed to encode the same repertoire as IBM Japanese DBCS-Host.

IBM-932 resembles IBM-943. One difference is that IBM-932 encodes the JIS X 0208:1983 characters but preserves the 1978 ordering, whereas IBM-943 uses the 1983 ordering (i.e. the character variant swaps made in JIS X 0208:1983). Another difference is that IBM-932 does not incorporate the NEC selected extensions, which IBM-943 includes for Microsoft compatibility.

IBM-942 includes the same double-byte codes as IBM-932 (those from Code page 301) but includes additional single-byte extensions. International Components for Unicode treats "ibm-932" and "ibm-942" as aliases for the same decoder.

IBM-932 contains 7-bit ISO 646 codes, and Japanese characters are indicated by the high bit of the first byte being set to 1. Some code points in this page require a second byte, so characters use either 8 or 16 bits for encoding.

== Layout ==
First byte
	0	1	2	3	4	5	6	7	8	9	A	B	C	D	E	F
0	␀	␁	␂	␃	␄	␅	␆	␇	␈	␉	␊	␋	␌	␍	␎	␏
1	␐	␑	␒	␓	␔	␕	␖	␗	␘	␙	␚	␛	␜	␝	␞	␟
2	␠	!	"	#	$	%	&	'	(	)	*	+	,	-	.	/
3	0	1	2	3	4	5	6	7	8	9	:	;	<	=	>	?
4	@	A	B	C	D	E	F	G	H	I	J	K	L	M	N	O
5	P	Q	R	S	T	U	V	W	X	Y	Z	[	¥	]	^	_
6	`	a	b	c	d	e	f	g	h	i	j	k	l	m	n	o
7	p	q	r	s	t	u	v	w	x	y	z	{	|	}	‾	␡
8
9
A		｡	｢	｣	､	･	ｦ	ｧ	ｨ	ｩ	ｪ	ｫ	ｬ	ｭ	ｮ	ｯ
B	ｰ	ｱ	ｲ	ｳ	ｴ	ｵ	ｶ	ｷ	ｸ	ｹ	ｺ	ｻ	ｼ	ｽ	ｾ	ｿ
C	ﾀ	ﾁ	ﾂ	ﾃ	ﾄ	ﾅ	ﾆ	ﾇ	ﾈ	ﾉ	ﾊ	ﾋ	ﾌ	ﾍ	ﾎ	ﾏ
D	ﾐ	ﾑ	ﾒ	ﾓ	ﾔ	ﾕ	ﾖ	ﾗ	ﾘ	ﾙ	ﾚ	ﾛ	ﾜ	ﾝ	ﾞ	ﾟ
E
F

Second byte
	0	1	2	3	4	5	6	7	8	9	A	B	C	D	E	F
0
1
2
3
4
5
6
7
8
9
A
B
C
D
E
F

Non printable ASCII character
Unaltered ASCII character
Modified ASCII character
Single-byte half-width katakana
First byte of a double-byte character, used by JIS X 0208
Not used as first byte, unallocated space in JIS X 0208
First byte of a double-byte IBM extension character
First byte of a double-byte IBM-designated user defined character
Not used as first byte
Second byte of a double-byte character whose first half of the JIS sequence was odd
Second byte of a double-byte character whose first half of the JIS sequence was even
Unused as second byte of a double-byte character

== See also ==
- LMBCS-16
- Code page 942
- Code page 943
