= JIS X 0213 =

Japanese standard character set

- Languages: Japanese, English, Ainu, Russian; Partial support: Greek, Chinese
- Standard: JIS X 0213
- Classification: ISO 2022, DBCS, CJK encoding
- Extends: JIS X 0208
- Encoding formats: Shift_JIS-2004; ISO-2022-JP-2004; EUC-JIS-2004
- Preceded by: JIS X 0208, JIS X 0212

Euler diagram comparing repertoires of JIS X 0208, JIS X 0212, JIS X 0213, Windows-31J, the Microsoft standard repertoire and Unicode

JIS X 0213 is a Japanese Industrial Standard defining coded character sets for encoding the characters used in Japan. This standard extends JIS X 0208. The first version was published in 2000 and revised in 2004 (JIS2004) and 2012. As well as adding a number of special characters, characters with diacritic marks, etc., it included an additional 3,625 kanji. The full name of the standard is 7-bit and 8-bit double byte coded extended KANJI sets for information interchange (7ビット及び8ビットの2バイト情報交換用符号化拡張漢字集合, Nana-Bitto Oyobi Hachi-Bitto no Ni-Baito Jōhō Kōkan'yō Fugōka Kakuchō Kanji Shūgō).

JIS X 0213 has two "planes" (94×94 character tables). Plane 1 is a superset of JIS X 0208 containing kanji sets level 1 to 3 and non-kanji characters such as Hiragana, Katakana (including letters used to write the Ainu language), Latin, Greek and Cyrillic alphabets, digits, symbols and so on. Plane 2 contains only level 4 kanji set. Total number of the defined characters is 11,233. Each character is capable of being encoded in two bytes.

This standard largely replaced the rarely used JIS X 0212-1990 "supplementary" standard, which included 5,801 kanji and 266 non-kanji. Of the additional 3,695 kanji in JIS X 0213, all but 952 were already in JIS X 0212.

JIS X 0213 defines several 7-bit and 8-bit encodings including EUC-JIS-2004, ISO-2022-JP-2004 and Shift JIS-2004. Also, it defines the mapping from each of these encodings to ISO/IEC 10646 (Unicode) for each character.

Unicode version 3.2 incorporated all characters of JIS X 0213 except for the characters that could be represented using combining characters. Because about 300 kanji are in Unicode Plane 2, Unicode implementations supporting only the Basic Multilingual Plane cannot handle all of the JIS X 0213 characters. This is not an issue for most applications, however.

Glyph variants changed by the 2004 edition (click to enlarge).

The 2004 edition of JIS X 0213 changed the recommended renderings of 168 kanji. Ten additional kanji were added in JIS X 0213:2004.

== See also ==
- JIS X 0208
- JIS X 0212
- Migration from JIS X 0208 to JIS X 0213
- Relation of JIS X 0208 to JIS X 0213
