= I (kana) =

i

Hiragana	Katakana
- Transliteration: i
- Hiragana origin: 以
- Katakana origin: 伊
- Man'yōgana: 伊 怡 以 異 已 移 射 五
- Spelling kana: いろはのイ (Iroha no "i")

I (い in hiragana or イ in katakana) is one of the Japanese kana each of which represents one mora. い is based on the sōsho style of the kanji character 以, and イ is from the radical (left part) of the kanji character 伊. In the modern Japanese system of sound order, it occupies the second position of the mora chart, between あ and う. Additionally, it is the first letter in Iroha, before ろ. Both represent the sound [i]. In the Ainu language, katakana イ is written as y in their Latin-based mora chart, and a small ィ after another katakana represents a diphthong.

Form	Rōmaji	Hiragana	Katakana
Normal a/i/u/e/o (あ行 a-gyō)	i	い	イ
Normal a/i/u/e/o (あ行 a-gyō)	ii, yi ī	いい, いぃ いー	イイ, イィ イー

Other additional forms

Form (y-)
Rōmaji	Hiragana	Katakana
yi	いぃ	イィ
ye	いぇ	イェ

== Variant forms ==
Like other vowels, scaled-down versions of the kana (ぃ, ィ) are used to express sounds foreign to the Japanese language, such as フィ (fi). In some Okinawan writing systems, a small ぃ is also combined with the kana く (ku) and ふ to form the digraphs くぃ kwi and ふぃ hwi respectively, although the Ryukyu University system uses the kana ゐ/ヰ instead.

== Origin ==
い comes from the left part of the Kanji 以, while イ originates from the left part of the Kanji 伊. An alternate form - 𛀆, based on the full cursive form of 以 is one of the most common hentaigana, as it merged with い late in the development of modern Japanese writing.

== Stroke order ==
Stroke order in writing い

Stroke order in writing イ

Stroke order in writing い

The Hiragana い is made in two strokes:

1. At the top left, a curved vertical stroke, ending with a hook at the bottom.
2. At the top right, a shorter stroke, slightly curving in the opposite direction.

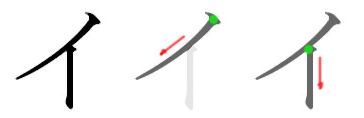
Stroke order in writing イ

The Katakana イ is made in two strokes:

1. At the top, a curved diagonal line going from right to left.
2. In the center of the last stroke, a vertical line going down.

== Other communicative representations ==
Japanese radiotelephony alphabet	Wabun code
いろはのイ; Iroha no "I"	▄ ▄▄▄

Japanese Navy Signal Flag

Japanese semaphore
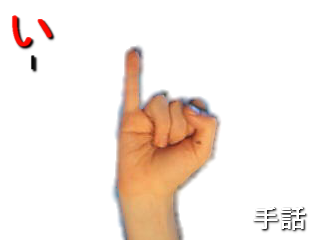
Japanese manual syllabary (fingerspelling)
Braille dots-12
Japanese Braille

=== Braille forms ===
い / イ in Japanese Braille
い / イ i	いい / イー ī	+い / +ー chōon*
⠃ (braille pattern dots-12)	⠃ (braille pattern dots-12) ⠒ (braille pattern dots-25)	⠒ (braille pattern dots-25)

* When lengthening "-i" or "-e" morae in Japanese braille, a chōon is always used, as is standard in katakana orthography, instead of adding the い / イ kana.

=== Computer encodings ===
Character information
Preview	い		イ		ｲ		㋑	
Unicode name	HIRAGANA LETTER I		KATAKANA LETTER I		HALFWIDTH KATAKANA LETTER I		CIRCLED KATAKANA I	
Encodings	decimal	hex	dec	hex	dec	hex	dec	hex
Unicode	12356	U+3044	12452	U+30A4	65394	U+FF72	13009	U+32D1
UTF-8	227 129 132	E3 81 84	227 130 164	E3 82 A4	239 189 178	EF BD B2	227 139 145	E3 8B 91
Numeric character reference	&#12356;	&#x3044;	&#12452;	&#x30A4;	&#65394;	&#xFF72;	&#13009;	&#x32D1;
Shift JIS	130 162	82 A2	131 67	83 43	178	B2		
EUC-JP	164 164	A4 A4	165 164	A5 A4	142 178	8E B2		
GB 18030	164 164	A4 A4	165 164	A5 A4	132 49 151 52	84 31 97 34	129 57 209 55	81 39 D1 37
EUC-KR / UHC	170 164	AA A4	171 164	AB A4				
Big5 (non-ETEN kana)	198 168	C6 A8	198 251	C6 FB				
Big5 (ETEN / HKSCS)	198 234	C6 EA	199 126	C7 7E				

Character information
Preview	ぃ		ィ		ｨ	
Unicode name	HIRAGANA LETTER SMALL I		KATAKANA LETTER SMALL I		HALFWIDTH KATAKANA LETTER SMALL I	
Encodings	decimal	hex	dec	hex	dec	hex
Unicode	12355	U+3043	12451	U+30A3	65384	U+FF68
UTF-8	227 129 131	E3 81 83	227 130 163	E3 82 A3	239 189 168	EF BD A8
Numeric character reference	&#12355;	&#x3043;	&#12451;	&#x30A3;	&#65384;	&#xFF68;
Shift JIS	130 161	82 A1	131 66	83 42	168	A8
EUC-JP	164 163	A4 A3	165 163	A5 A3	142 168	8E A8
GB 18030	164 163	A4 A3	165 163	A5 A3	132 49 150 52	84 31 96 34
EUC-KR / UHC	170 163	AA A3	171 163	AB A3		
Big5 (non-ETEN kana)	198 167	C6 A7	198 250	C6 FA		
Big5 (ETEN / HKSCS)	198 233	C6 E9	199 125	C7 7D		
