= Half-width =

Half width may refer to:

- Full width at half maximum
- Halfwidth and fullwidth forms
- Half-width kana
