= Code page 904 =

Computer encoding for traditional Chinese characters

- MIME / IANA: IBM904
- Alias(es): cp904, 904
- Extends: US-ASCII
- Extensions: Code page 1043, Code page 1115
- Other related encoding: Code page 903

Code page 904 (CCSID 904) is encoded for use as the single byte component of certain traditional Chinese character encodings. It is used in Taiwan. When combined with the double-byte Code page 927, it forms the two code-sets of Code page 938.

== Code page layout ==
Code page 904
| | 0 | 1 | 2 | 3 | 4 | 5 | 6 | 7 | 8 | 9 | A | B | C | D | E | F |
|---|---|---|---|---|---|---|---|---|---|---|---|---|---|---|---|---|
| 0x | NUL | ╔ | ╗ | ╚ | ╝ | ║ | ═ | ￬ | BS | ￮ | LF | 〿 | FF | CR | ￭ | ☼ |
| 1x | ╬ | DC1 | ↕ | DC3 | ▓ | ╩ | ╦ | ╣ | CAN | ╠ | ░ | ↵ | ￪ | ￨ | ￫ | ￩ |
| 2x | SP | ! | " | # | $ | % | & | ' | ( | ) | * | + | , | - | . | / |
| 3x | 0 | 1 | 2 | 3 | 4 | 5 | 6 | 7 | 8 | 9 | : | ; | < | = | > | ? |
| 4x | @ | A | B | C | D | E | F | G | H | I | J | K | L | M | N | O |
| 5x | P | Q | R | S | T | U | V | W | X | Y | Z | [ | \ | ] | | _ |
| 6x | ` | a | b | c | d | e | f | g | h | i | j | k | l | m | n | o |
| 7x | p | q | r | s | t | u | v | w | x | y | z | { | | | } | ~ | DEL |
