= Code page 936 =

Code page 936 may refer to one of two character encodings for Simplified Chinese:

- Code page 936 (IBM), a combination of code pages 903 and 928, now superseded
- Code page 936 (Microsoft Windows), a variant of the GBK encoding, still in general use
