= U (kana) =

u

Hiragana	Katakana
- Transliteration: u
- Translit. with dakuten: vu
- Hiragana origin: 宇
- Katakana origin: 宇
- Man'yōgana: 宇 羽 于 有 卯 烏 得
- Spelling kana: 上野のウ (Ueno no "u")
- Pronunciation

U (hiragana: う, katakana: ウ) is one of the Japanese kana, each of which represents one mora. In the modern Japanese system of alphabetical order, they occupy the third place in the modern Gojūon (五十音) system of collating kana. In the Iroha, they occupied the 24th position, between む and ゐ. In the Gojūon chart (ordered by columns, from right to left), う lies in the first column (あ行, "column A") and the third row (う段, "row U"). Both represent the sound [ɯ]. In the Ainu language, the small katakana ゥ represents a diphthong, and is written as w in the Latin alphabet.

Form	Rōmaji	Hiragana	Katakana
Normal a/i/u/e/o (あ行 a-gyō)	u	う	ウ
Normal a/i/u/e/o (あ行 a-gyō)	uu ū	うう うー	ウウ ウー

Other additional forms

Form A (w-)
Romaji	Hiragana	Katakana
wa	うぁ	ウァ
wi	うぃ	ウィ
wu	うぅ	ウゥ
we	うぇ	ウェ
wo	うぉ	ウォ
wya	うゃ	ウャ
wyu	うゅ	ウュ
wye	うぃぇ	ウィェ
wyo	うょ	ウョ

Form B (v-)
Romaji	Hiragana	Katakana
va	ゔぁ	ヴァ
vi, vyi	ゔぃ	ヴィ
vu	ゔ	ヴ
ve	ゔぇ	ヴェ
vo	ゔぉ	ヴォ
vya	ゔゃ	ヴャ
vyu	ゔゅ	ヴュ
vye	ゔぃぇ	ヴィェ
vyo	ゔょ	ヴョ

== Derivation ==
Both う and ウ originate, via man'yōgana, from the kanji 宇 (pronounced u and meaning space).

The katakana vu (ヴ), which is an u with a dakuten ("voiced mark"), along with va (ヷ), was first used by the educator Fukuzawa Yukichi for transcribing English in 1860 in his English-Japanese dictionary, which featured such entries as Heaven(ヒーヴヌ) (Hīvunu), Venus(ヴェヌス) (Venusu), River(リーヷル) (Rīvaru), etc. It is intended to represent a voiced labiodental fricative [v] in foreign languages, but the actual pronunciation by Japanese speakers may be closer to a voiced bilabial fricative [β] (see Japanese phonology § Voiced bilabial fricative).

== Variant forms ==
Scaled-down versions of the characters (ぅ, ゥ) are used to create new morae that do not exist in the Japanese language, such as トゥ (tu). This convention is relatively new, and many older loanwords do not use it. For example, in the phrase Tutankhamun's cartouche, the recent loan cartouche uses the new phonetic technique, but the older loan Tutankhamun uses ツ (tsu) as an approximation:

ツタンカーメン の カルトゥーシュ
Tsutankāmen no karutūshu

The character う is also used, in its full-sized form, to lengthen "o" sounds. For example, the word 構想 is written in hiragana as こうそう (kousou), pronounced kōsō. In a few words the character お (o) is used instead for morphological or historical reasons.

The character ウ can take dakuten to form ヴ (vu), a sound foreign to the Japanese language and traditionally approximated by ブ (bu).

In hentaigana a variant of う is appeared that retains cursive Kanji 宇.

== Stroke order ==
Stroke order in writing う

Stroke order in writing ウ

Stroke order in writing う

The hiragana う is written in two strokes:

1. At the top of the character, a short diagonal crook: proceeding diagonally downwards from the left, then reversing direction and ending at the lower left.
2. A broad curving stroke: beginning at the left, rising slightly, then curving back and ending at the left.

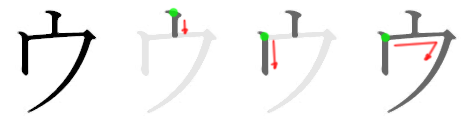
Stroke order in writing ウ

The katakana ウ is written in three strokes:

1. At the top of the character, a short vertical stroke, written from top to bottom.
2. A similar stroke, but lower and positioned at the left.
3. A broad angled stroke: beginning as a horizontal line written from left to right, then reversing direction and proceeding downwards from right to left as a curved diagonal. The horizontal line must touch both the other strokes. Apart from the short diagonal, the character is identical to フ.

== Other communicative representations ==
Japanese radiotelephony alphabet	Wabun code
上野のウ; Ueno no "U"	▄ ▄ ▄▄▄

Japanese Navy Signal Flag

Japanese semaphore
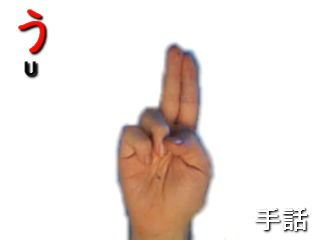
Japanese manual syllabary (fingerspelling)
Braille dots-14
Japanese Braille

=== Full Braille representation ===
う / ウ in Japanese Braille
う / ウ u	ゔ / ヴ vu	うう / ウー ū	ゔう / ヴー vū	+う / +ー chōon (Note: When lengthening "-u" or "-o" morae in Japanese braille, a Chōonpu is always used, as in standard katakana usage instead of adding an う / ウ.)
⠉ (braille pattern dots-14)	⠐ (braille pattern dots-5) ⠉ (braille pattern dots-14)	⠉ (braille pattern dots-14) ⠒ (braille pattern dots-25)	⠐ (braille pattern dots-5) ⠉ (braille pattern dots-14) ⠒ (braille pattern dots-25)	⠒ (braille pattern dots-25)

=== Computer encodings ===
Character information
Preview	う		ウ		ｳ		ぅ	
Unicode name	HIRAGANA LETTER U		KATAKANA LETTER U		HALFWIDTH KATAKANA LETTER U		HIRAGANA LETTER SMALL U	
Encodings	decimal	hex	dec	hex	dec	hex	dec	hex
Unicode	12358	U+3046	12454	U+30A6	65395	U+FF73	12357	U+3045
UTF-8	227 129 134	E3 81 86	227 130 166	E3 82 A6	239 189 179	EF BD B3	227 129 133	E3 81 85
Numeric character reference	&#12358;	&#x3046;	&#12454;	&#x30A6;	&#65395;	&#xFF73;	&#12357;	&#x3045;
Shift JIS	130 164	82 A4	131 69	83 45	179	B3	130 163	82 A3
EUC-JP	164 166	A4 A6	165 166	A5 A6	142 179	8E B3	164 165	A4 A5
GB 18030	164 166	A4 A6	165 166	A5 A6	132 49 151 53	84 31 97 35	164 165	A4 A5
EUC-KR / UHC	170 166	AA A6	171 166	AB A6			170 165	AA A5
Big5 (non-ETEN kana)	198 170	C6 AA	198 253	C6 FD			198 169	C6 A9
Big5 (ETEN / HKSCS)	198 236	C6 EC	199 162	C7 A2			198 235	C6 EB

Character information
Preview	ゥ		ｩ		ゔ		ヴ	
Unicode name	KATAKANA LETTER SMALL U		HALFWIDTH KATAKANA LETTER SMALL U		HIRAGANA LETTER VU		KATAKANA LETTER VU	
Encodings	decimal	hex	dec	hex	dec	hex	dec	hex
Unicode	12453	U+30A5	65385	U+FF69	12436	U+3094	12532	U+30F4
UTF-8	227 130 165	E3 82 A5	239 189 169	EF BD A9	227 130 148	E3 82 94	227 131 180	E3 83 B4
Numeric character reference	&#12453;	&#x30A5;	&#65385;	&#xFF69;	&#12436;	&#x3094;	&#12532;	&#x30F4;
Shift JIS (plain)	131 68	83 44	169	A9			131 148	83 94
Shift JIS (KanjiTalk 7)	131 68	83 44	169	A9	136 104	88 68	131 148	83 94
Shift JIS-2004	131 68	83 44	169	A9	130 242	82 F2	131 148	83 94
EUC-JP (plain)	165 165	A5 A5	142 169	8E A9			165 244	A5 F4
EUC-JIS-2004	165 165	A5 A5	142 169	8E A9	164 244	A4 F4	165 244	A5 F4
GB 18030	165 165	A5 A5	132 49 150 53	84 31 96 35	129 57 166 54	81 39 A6 36	165 244	A5 F4
EUC-KR / UHC	171 165	AB A5					171 244	AB F4
Big5 (non-ETEN kana)	198 252	C6 FC					199 174	C7 AE
Big5 (ETEN / HKSCS)	199 161	C7 A1					199 240	C7 F0

Character information
Preview	㋒	
Unicode name	CIRCLED KATAKANA U	
Encodings	decimal	hex
Unicode	13010	U+32D2
UTF-8	227 139 146	E3 8B 92
Numeric character reference	&#13010;	&#x32D2;
