= Code page 895 =

Japanese national 7-bit ASCII derivative

Code page 895 (CCSID 895) is a 7-bit character set and is Japan's national ISO 646 variant. It is the Roman set (first or left half) of the JIS X 0201 (formerly JIS C 6220) Japanese Standard and is variously called Japan 7-Bit Latin, JISCII, JIS Roman, JIS C6220-1969-ro, ISO646-JP or Japanese-Roman. Its ISO-IR registration number is 14.

Amongst IBM's code pages, it accompanies code page 896 (half-width katakana), which encodes the Kana set of JIS X 0201 with extensions, and code page 897 which encodes the 8-bit form of JIS X 0201. It is used in Unix-like systems and, when combined with code page 896 and the 2-byte IBM code page 952 and code page 953, makes up the four code-sets of code page 954, one of IBM's versions of EUC-JP.

== Code page layout ==
Code page 895 / ISO-IR-014
	0	1	2	3	4	5	6	7	8	9	A	B	C	D	E	F
0x																
1x																
2x	SP	!	"	#	$	%	&	'	(	)	*	+	,	-	.	/
3x	0	1	2	3	4	5	6	7	8	9	:	;	<	=	>	?
4x	@	A	B	C	D	E	F	G	H	I	J	K	L	M	N	O
5x	P	Q	R	S	T	U	V	W	X	Y	Z	[	¥	]		_
6x	`	a	b	c	d	e	f	g	h	i	j	k	l	m	n	o
7x	p	q	r	s	t	u	v	w	x	y	z	{	|	}	‾	DEL

Differences from US-ASCII

== See also ==
- Shift JIS
