= Yen and yuan sign =

Currency sign

¥

yen and yuan sign
- In Unicode: U+00A5 ¥ YEN SIGN (&yen;)

Currency
- Currency: Japanese yen and Chinese yuan

Graphical variants
- ￥
- U+FFE5 ￥ FULLWIDTH YEN SIGN

Related
- See also: U+5143 元 CJK UNIFIED IDEOGRAPH-5143 (Yuan); U+5186 円 CJK UNIFIED IDEOGRAPH-5186 (Yen)

Different from
- Different from: U+04B0 Ұ CYRILLIC CAPITAL LETTER STRAIGHT U WITH STROKE

The yen and yuan sign (¥) is a currency sign used to represent the base units yen (Japanese yen) and the Chinese yuan (renminbi) when writing in the Latin script. This character resembles a capital letter Y with a single or double horizontal stroke. The symbol is usually placed before the value it represents, for example: ¥50, or JP¥50 and CN¥50 when disambiguation is needed. (Note: JP and CN are the ISO 3166-1 alpha-2 codes for Japan and China respectively) When written in Japanese and Chinese, the Japanese kanji or Chinese character follows the amount, for example 50円 in Japan and 50元 or 50圆 in China.

== History ==
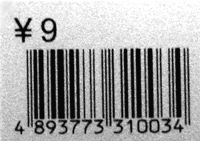
An example of a price sticker from China

=== Japan ===
After the institution of Japan's New Currency Act, from 1871 through the early 20th century, the yen was either referred to (in documents printed in Latin script) by its full name yen, or abbreviated with a capital "Y". One of the earliest uses of ¥ can be found in J. Twizell Wawn's "Japanese Municipal Government With an Account of the Administration of the City of Kobe", published in 1899. Usage of the sign increased in the early 20th century, primarily in Western English-speaking countries, but has become commonly used in Japan as well.

== Code points ==
The Unicode code point is U+00A5 ¥ YEN SIGN (&yen;). Additionally, there is a full width character, ￥, at code point U+FFE5 ￥ FULLWIDTH YEN SIGN (Note: In the block "Halfwidth and Fullwidth Forms") for use with wide fonts, especially East Asian fonts.

There was no code-point for any ¥ symbol in the original (7-bit) US-ASCII and consequently many early systems reassigned 5C (allocated to the backslash (\) in ASCII) to the yen sign. With the arrival of 8-bit encoding, the ISO/IEC 8859-1 ("ISO Latin 1") character set assigned code point A5 to the ¥ in 1985; Unicode continues this encoding.

In JIS X 0201, of which Shift JIS is an extension, assigns code point 0x5C to the Latin-script yen sign: as noted above, this is the code used for the backslash in ASCII and also subsequently in Unicode. The JIS X 0201 standard was widely adopted in Japan.

=== Microsoft Windows ===
Microsoft adopted the ISO code A5 in Windows-1252 for the Americas and Western Europe but Japanese-language locales of Microsoft operating systems use the code page 932 character encoding, which is a variant of Shift JIS. Hence, 0x5C is displayed as a yen sign in Japanese-locale fonts on Windows. It is thus displayed wherever a backslash is used, such as the directory separator character (for example, in C:¥ rather than C:\) and as the general escape character (¥n). It is mapped onto the Unicode U+005C \ REVERSE SOLIDUS (i.e. backslash), while Unicode U+00A5 ¥ YEN SIGN is given a one-way "best fit" mapping to 0x5C in code page 932, and 0x5C is displayed as a backslash in Microsoft's documentation for code page 932, essentially making it a backslash given the appearance of a yen sign by localized fonts. (Similarly in Korean versions of Windows, 0x5C was reassigned to hold the Won sign (₩) and has similar presentation issues.)

=== IBM EBCDIC ===
IBM's Code page 437 used code point 9D for the ¥ and this encoding was also used by several other computer systems. The ¥ is assigned code point B2 in EBCDIC 500 and many other EBCDIC code pages.

== Chinese input methods ==
Under Chinese Pinyin input method editors (IMEs) such as those from Microsoft or Sogou.com, typing $ displays the full-width character ￥, which is different from half-width ¥ used in Japanese IMEs.

== Native characters ==
In East Asia, several CJK characters (Chinese characters, Japanese Kanji, and Korean Hanja) are used when writing own currencies in local languages. These characters include 円, 元, 圆, 圓, 圜. In Hong Kong, Macau, Singapore and Taiwan, these characters are also used as the local language counterpart in parallel with the dollar sign ($) (or HK$, MOP$, S$ or NT$ when necessary to indicate which currency is meant). The name of the North Korean and South Korean won (₩) comes from the equivalent hanja (圓, 圜) (원, won).

Character	Type	Use
圓	Traditional Chinese characters Japanese Kyūjitai, and Korean Hanja	Current official currency unit of Taiwan on Taiwanese dollar banknotes and coins; Current official currency unit of Macau on Macanese pataca banknotes and coins; Historical official currency unit of China, Japan and Korea until late 1950s
圜	A variant of Korean Hanja	Historical official currency unit of Korean Empire in early 20th century
圆	Simplified Chinese characters	Current official currency unit of China on Chinese yuan banknotes and coins
円	Japanese Shinjitai	Current official currency unit of Japan on Japanese yen banknotes and coins
元	A variant of Chinese characters	Current official currency unit of Hong Kong on Hong Kong dollar banknotes and coins; Widely used in societies of China, Hong Kong, Macau, Singapore and Taiwan as the unofficial local currency unit; Used in Chinese as a translation for currencies named dollar

== Other uses ==
=== Turkmenistan ===
In the 1993 Turkmen orthography, the yen sign was used as the capital form of ÿ and represented the sound /j/. It was replaced with Ý in 1999.

== See also ==
- Unicode input – Input characters using their Unicode code points (methods to enter this symbol on computer systems where it is not routinely available)
