= Chōonpu =

Japanese punctuation mark

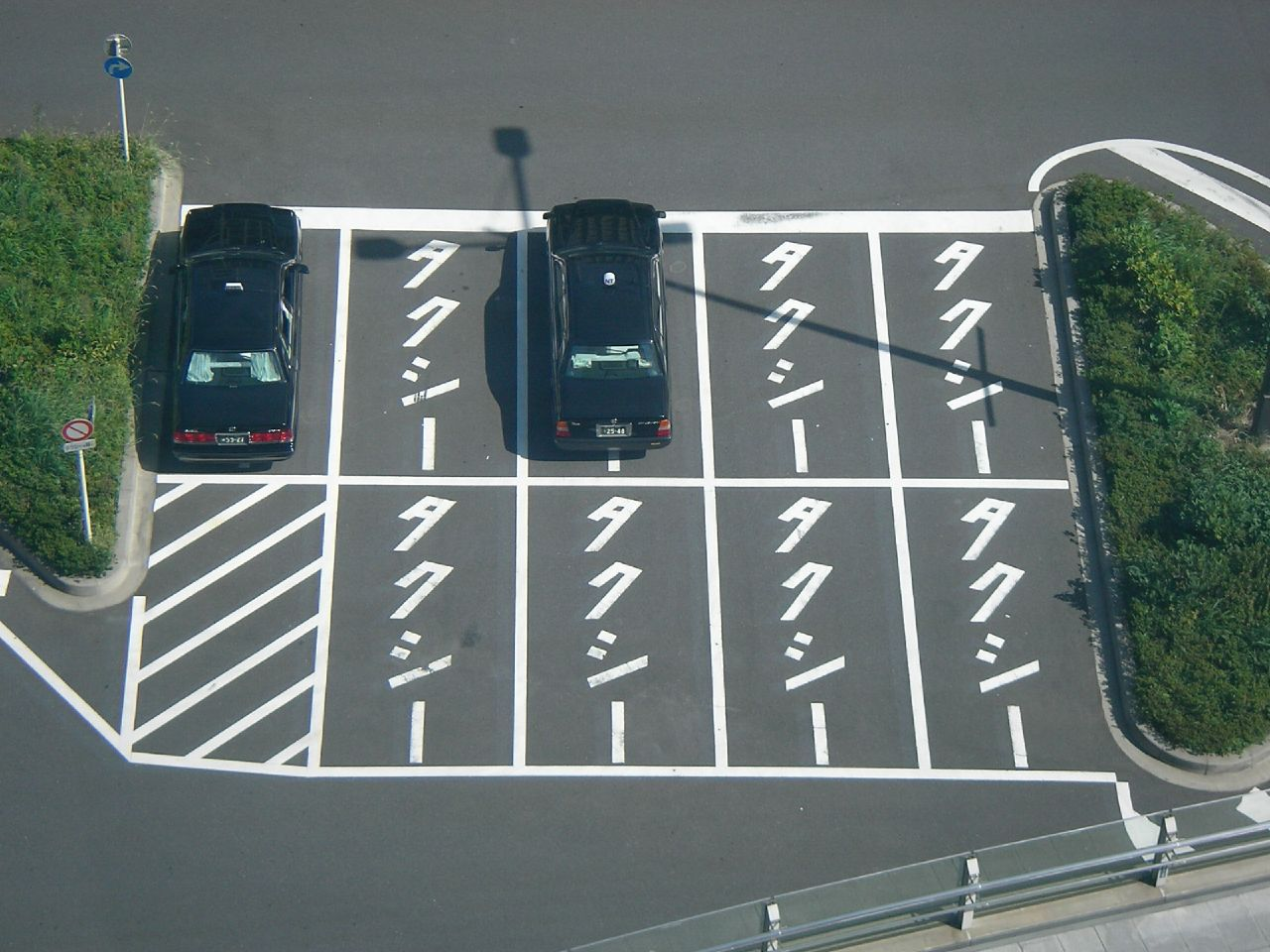
The word タクシー (takushī, 'taxi') written vertically with vertical chōonpu

The chōonpu (Japanese: 長音符; lit. "long sound symbol"), also known as chōonkigō (長音記号), onbiki (音引き), bōbiki (棒引き), or Katakana-Hiragana Prolonged Sound Mark by the Unicode Consortium, is a Japanese symbol that indicates a chōon, or a long vowel of two morae in length. Its form is a horizontal or vertical line in the center of the text with the width of one kanji or kana character. It is written horizontally in horizontal text and vertically in vertical text (ー). The chōonpu is usually used to indicate a long vowel sound in katakana writing and rarely in hiragana writing. The chōonpu is a distinct mark from the dash, and in most Japanese typefaces it can easily be distinguished. In horizontal writing it is similar in appearance to, but should not be confused with, the kanji character 一 ("one").

The symbol is sometimes used with hiragana, for example in the signs of ramen restaurants, which are often written らーめん in hiragana, while the most standard orthography would be in katakana: ラーメン. Canonically, however, hiragana never uses the chōonpu; instead, another vowel kana is used to express the long vowel. This applies in theory to onomatopoeia written in hiragana as well, but the use of the chōonpu is generally tolerated and common: おーい for おおい.

The following table shows the usual hiragana equivalents used to form a long vowel, using the ka-gyō (the ka, ki, ku, ke, ko sequence) as an example.

| Rōmaji | Hiragana | Katakana |
|---|---|---|
| kā (kaa) | かあ | カー |
| kī (kii) | きい | キー |
| kū (kuu) | くう | クー |
| kē (kee or kei) | けえ or けい | ケー |
| kō (koo or kou) | こお or こう | コー |

Onbiki may also be found after kanji as indication of phonetic, rather than phonemic, length of a vowel (as in "キョン君、電話ー").

When rendering English words into katakana, the chōonpu is often used to represent a syllable-final sequence of a vowel letter + r, which in English generally represents a long vowel if the syllable is stressed and a schwa if unstressed (in non-rhotic dialects such as Received Pronunciation; in rhotic dialects (such as General American) it may additionally be an R-colored vowel). For example, "or" is usually represented by a long ō (oo or ou) vowel, with the word "torch" becoming トーチ tōchi.

In addition to Japanese, chōonpu are also used in Okinawan writing systems to indicate two morae. The Sakhalin dialect of Ainu also uses chōonpu in its katakana writing for long vowels.

== Digital encoding ==
In Unicode, the chōonpu has the value U+30FC ー KATAKANA-HIRAGANA PROLONGED SOUND MARK, which corresponds to JIS X 0208 kuten code point 01-28, encoded in Shift JIS as 815B. It is normally rendered fullwidth and with a glyph appropriate to the writing direction. The halfwidth compatibility form has the value U+FF70 ｰ HALFWIDTH KATAKANA-HIRAGANA PROLONGED SOUND MARK, which is converted to Shift JIS value B0.

Character information
| Preview | ー | | ｰ | |
|---|---|---|---|---|
| Unicode name | KATAKANA-HIRAGANA PROLONGED SOUND MARK | | HALFWIDTH KATAKANA-HIRAGANA PROLONGED SOUND MARK | |
| Encodings | decimal | hex | dec | hex |
| Unicode | 12540 | U+30FC | 65392 | U+FF70 |
| UTF-8 | 227 131 188 | E3 83 BC | 239 189 176 | EF BD B0 |
| Numeric character reference | &#12540; | &#x30FC; | &#65392; | &#xFF70; |
| Shift JIS | 129 91 | 81 5B | 176 | B0 |
| EUC-JP | 161 188 | A1 BC | 142 176 | 8E B0 |
| GB 18030 | 169 96 | A9 60 | 132 49 151 50 | 84 31 97 32 |
| KPS 9566-2011 | 234 72 | EA 48 | | |
| Big5 (ETEN / HKSCS) (Note: The other kana layout for Big5 does not include a chōonpu.) | 198 227 | C6 E3 | | |

== Other representations ==
Braille:

== See also ==
- Sokuon
