= Halfwidth and Fullwidth Forms (Unicode block) =

- Range: U+FF00..U+FFEF (240 code points)
- Plane: BMP
- Scripts: Hangul (52 char.); Katakana (55 char.); Latin (52 char.); Common (66 char.)
- Symbol sets: Variant width characters
- Assigned: 225 code points
- Unused: 15 reserved code points

Unicode Version History
- 1.0.0 (1991): 216 (+216)
- 1.1 (1993): 223 (+7)
- 3.2 (2002): 225 (+2)

Unicode documentation
- Code chart ∣ Web page

Halfwidth and Fullwidth Forms is a Unicode block U+FF00–FFEF, provided so that older encodings containing both halfwidth and fullwidth characters can have lossless translation to and from Unicode. It is the second-to-last block of the Basic Multilingual Plane, followed only by the short Specials block at U+FFF0–FFFF. Its block name in Unicode 1.0 was Halfwidth and Fullwidth Variants.

Range U+FF01–FF5E reproduces the characters of ASCII 21 to 7E as fullwidth forms. U+FF00 does not correspond to a fullwidth ASCII 20 (space character), since that role is already fulfilled by U+3000 "ideographic space".

Range U+FF61–FF9F encodes halfwidth forms of katakana and related punctuation in a transposition of A1 to DF in the JIS X 0201 encoding – see half-width kana.

The range U+FFA0–FFDC encodes halfwidth forms of compatibility jamo characters for Hangul, in a transposition of their 1974 standard layout. It is used in the mapping of some IBM encodings for Korean, such as IBM code page 933, which allows the use of the Shift Out and Shift In characters to shift to a double-byte character set. Since the double-byte character set could contain compatibility jamo, halfwidth variants are needed to provide round-trip compatibility.

Range U+FFE0–FFEE includes fullwidth and halfwidth symbols.

== Block ==
Halfwidth and Fullwidth Forms^{[1]}^{[2]} Official Unicode Consortium code chart (PDF)
	0	1	2	3	4	5	6	7	8	9	A	B	C	D	E	F
U+FF0x		！	＂	＃	＄	％	＆	＇	（	）	＊	＋	，	－	．	／
U+FF1x	０	１	２	３	４	５	６	７	８	９	：	；	＜	＝	＞	？
U+FF2x	＠	Ａ	Ｂ	Ｃ	Ｄ	Ｅ	Ｆ	Ｇ	Ｈ	Ｉ	Ｊ	Ｋ	Ｌ	Ｍ	Ｎ	Ｏ
U+FF3x	Ｐ	Ｑ	Ｒ	Ｓ	Ｔ	Ｕ	Ｖ	Ｗ	Ｘ	Ｙ	Ｚ	［	＼	］	＾	＿
U+FF4x	｀	ａ	ｂ	ｃ	ｄ	ｅ	ｆ	ｇ	ｈ	ｉ	ｊ	ｋ	ｌ	ｍ	ｎ	ｏ
U+FF5x	ｐ	ｑ	ｒ	ｓ	ｔ	ｕ	ｖ	ｗ	ｘ	ｙ	ｚ	｛	｜	｝	～	｟
U+FF6x	｠	｡	｢	｣	､	･	ｦ	ｧ	ｨ	ｩ	ｪ	ｫ	ｬ	ｭ	ｮ	ｯ
U+FF7x	ｰ	ｱ	ｲ	ｳ	ｴ	ｵ	ｶ	ｷ	ｸ	ｹ	ｺ	ｻ	ｼ	ｽ	ｾ	ｿ
U+FF8x	ﾀ	ﾁ	ﾂ	ﾃ	ﾄ	ﾅ	ﾆ	ﾇ	ﾈ	ﾉ	ﾊ	ﾋ	ﾌ	ﾍ	ﾎ	ﾏ
U+FF9x	ﾐ	ﾑ	ﾒ	ﾓ	ﾔ	ﾕ	ﾖ	ﾗ	ﾘ	ﾙ	ﾚ	ﾛ	ﾜ	ﾝ	ﾞ	ﾟ
U+FFAx	HW; HF	ﾡ	ﾢ	ﾣ	ﾤ	ﾥ	ﾦ	ﾧ	ﾨ	ﾩ	ﾪ	ﾫ	ﾬ	ﾭ	ﾮ	ﾯ
U+FFBx	ﾰ	ﾱ	ﾲ	ﾳ	ﾴ	ﾵ	ﾶ	ﾷ	ﾸ	ﾹ	ﾺ	ﾻ	ﾼ	ﾽ	ﾾ	
U+FFCx			ￂ	ￃ	ￄ	ￅ	ￆ	ￇ			ￊ	ￋ	ￌ	ￍ	ￎ	ￏ
U+FFDx			ￒ	ￓ	ￔ	ￕ	ￖ	ￗ			ￚ	ￛ	ￜ			
U+FFEx	￠	￡	￢	￣	￤	￥	￦		￨	￩	￪	￫	￬	￭	￮	
Notes 1.As of Unicode version 17.0 2.Grey areas indicate non-assigned code points

The block has variation sequences defined for East Asian punctuation positional variants. They use U+FE00 VARIATION SELECTOR-1 (VS01) and U+FE01 VARIATION SELECTOR-2 (VS02):

Variation sequences for punctuation alignment
U+	FF01	FF0C	FF0E	FF1A	FF1B	FF1F	Description
base code point	！	，	．	：	；	？	
base + VS01	！︀	，︀	．︀	：︀	；︀	？︀	corner-justified form
base + VS02	！︁	，︁	．︁	：︁	；︁	？︁	centered form

An additional variant is defined for a fullwidth zero with a short diagonal stroke: U+FF10 FULLWIDTH DIGIT ZERO, U+FE00 VS1 (０︀).

== History ==
The following Unicode-related documents record the purpose and process of defining specific characters in the Halfwidth and Fullwidth Forms block:

Version	Final code points (Note: Proposed code points and characters names may differ from final code points and names)	Count	L2 ID	WG2 ID	Document
1.0.0	U+FF01..FF5E, FF61..FFBE, FFC2..FFC7, FFCA..FFCF, FFD2..FFD7, FFDA..FFDC, FFE0..FFE6	216			(to be determined)
1.0.0	U+FF01..FF5E, FF61..FFBE, FFC2..FFC7, FFCA..FFCF, FFD2..FFD7, FFDA..FFDC, FFE0..FFE6	216		N4403 (pdf, doc)	Umamaheswaran, V. S. (2014-01-28), "Resolution M61.01", Unconfirmed minutes of WG 2 meeting 61, Holiday Inn, Vilnius, Lithuania; 2013-06-10/14
1.0.0	U+FF01..FF5E, FF61..FFBE, FFC2..FFC7, FFCA..FFCF, FFD2..FFD7, FFDA..FFDC, FFE0..FFE6	216	L2/17-056		Lunde, Ken (2017-02-13), Proposal to add standardized variation sequences
1.0.0	U+FF01..FF5E, FF61..FFBE, FFC2..FFC7, FFCA..FFCF, FFD2..FFD7, FFDA..FFDC, FFE0..FFE6	216	L2/17-436		Lunde, Ken (2018-01-21), Proposal to add standardized variation sequences for fullwidth East Asian punctuation
1.0.0	U+FF01..FF5E, FF61..FFBE, FFC2..FFC7, FFCA..FFCF, FFD2..FFD7, FFDA..FFDC, FFE0..FFE6	216	L2/18-039		Anderson, Deborah; Whistler, Ken; Pournader, Roozbeh; Moore, Lisa; Liang, Hai; Cook, Richard (2018-01-19), "24. Fullwidth East Asian Punctuation", Recommendations to UTC #154 January 2018 on Script Proposals
1.0.0	U+FF01..FF5E, FF61..FFBE, FFC2..FFC7, FFCA..FFCF, FFD2..FFD7, FFDA..FFDC, FFE0..FFE6	216	L2/17-362		Moore, Lisa (2018-02-02), "B.4.1 New Proposal to add standardized variation sequence for U+FF10 FULL WIDTH DIGIT ZERO", UTC #153 Minutes
1.0.0	U+FF01..FF5E, FF61..FFBE, FFC2..FFC7, FFCA..FFCF, FFD2..FFD7, FFDA..FFDC, FFE0..FFE6	216	L2/18-115		Moore, Lisa (2018-05-09), "Consensus 154-C17", UTC #155 Minutes, "Add 16 standardized variation sequences based on L2/17-436R, for Unicode 12.0."
1.0.0	U+FF01..FF5E, FF61..FFBE, FFC2..FFC7, FFCA..FFCF, FFD2..FFD7, FFDA..FFDC, FFE0..FFE6	216	L2/19-055		Iancu, Laurențiu (2019-01-14), Proposed Changes in the Segmentation Property Values for Fullwidth Digits
1.0.0	U+FF01..FF5E, FF61..FFBE, FFC2..FFC7, FFCA..FFCF, FFD2..FFD7, FFDA..FFDC, FFE0..FFE6	216	L2/19-008		Moore, Lisa (2019-02-08), "B.11.11.1.2 Proposed changes in the segmentation property values for fullwidth digits", UTC #158 Minutes
1.1	U+FFE8..FFEE	7			(to be determined)
3.2	U+FF5F..FF60	2	L2/99-052		Freytag, Asmus (1999-02-05), The math pieces from the symbol font
3.2	U+FF5F..FF60	2	L2/01-033		Karlsson, Kent; Freytag, Asmus (2001-01-16), Disunify braces/brackets for math, computing science, and Z notation from similar-looking CJK braces/brackets
3.2	U+FF5F..FF60	2	L2/01-159	N2344	Ad-hoc report on Mathematical Symbols, 2001-04-03
3.2	U+FF5F..FF60	2	L2/01-157	N2345R	Karlsson, Kent (2001-04-04), Proposal to disunify certain fencing CJK punctuation marks from similar-looking Math fences
3.2	U+FF5F..FF60	2	L2/01-168		Whistler, Ken (2001-04-10), Bracket Disunification & Normalization Hell
3.2	U+FF5F..FF60	2	L2/01-012R		Moore, Lisa (2001-05-21), "Disunifying Braces and Brackets", Minutes UTC #86 in Mountain View, Jan 2001
3.2	U+FF5F..FF60	2	L2/01-223		Suignard, Michel (2001-05-23), Discussion of Issues Regarding Bracket Disunification
3.2	U+FF5F..FF60	2	L2/01-184R		Moore, Lisa (2001-06-18), "Motion 87-M21", Minutes from the UTC/L2 meeting, "Reverse the decision made in motion 86-M6 not to disunify brackets."
3.2	U+FF5F..FF60	2	L2/01-317		Suignard, Michel (2001-08-14), Bracket Disunification & Normalization
3.2	U+FF5F..FF60	2	L2/01-295R		Moore, Lisa (2001-11-06), "Bracket Disunification and Normalization", Minutes from the UTC/L2 meeting #88
3.2	U+FF5F..FF60	2	L2/02-154	N2403	Umamaheswaran, V. S. (2002-04-22), "Resolution M41.1", Draft minutes of WG 2 meeting 41, Hotel Phoenix, Singapore, 2001-10-15/19

== See also ==
- CJK Symbols and Punctuation (Unicode block)
- Hangul Jamo (Unicode block)
- Katakana (Unicode block)
- Latin script in Unicode
- Enclosed Alphanumerics (Unicode block) - bullet point sequences; some appear as full width (e.g. ⒈,⓵,⑴,⒜,ⓐ)
