= Halfwidth and fullwidth forms =

Alternative width characters in East Asian typography

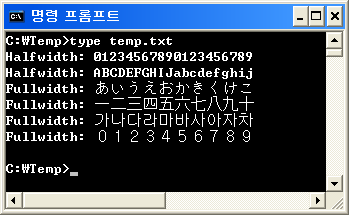
A command prompt (cmd.exe) with Korean localisation, showing halfwidth and fullwidth characters

In CJK (Chinese, Japanese, and Korean) computing, graphic characters are traditionally classed into fullwidth (Note: In Taiwan and Hong Kong: 全形; in CJK: 全角.) and halfwidth (Note: In Taiwan and Hong Kong: 半形; in CJK: 半角.) characters. Unlike monospaced fonts, a halfwidth character occupies half the width of a fullwidth character, hence the name.

Halfwidth and Fullwidth Forms is also the name of a Unicode block U+FF00–FFEF, provided so that older encodings containing both halfwidth and fullwidth characters can have lossless translation to and from Unicode.

== Rationale ==
Characters which appear in both JIS X 0201 (single byte) and JIS X 0208 / JIS X 0213 (double byte) have both a halfwidth and a fullwidth form in Shift JIS.

In the days of text mode computing, Western characters were normally laid out in a grid on the screen, often 80 columns by 24 or 25 lines. Each character was displayed as a small dot matrix, often about 8 pixels wide, and an SBCS (single-byte character set) was generally used to encode characters of Western languages.

For aesthetic reasons and readability, it is preferable for Chinese characters to be approximately square-shaped, therefore twice as wide as these fixed-width SBCS characters. As these were typically encoded in a DBCS (double-byte character set), this also meant that their width on screen in a duospaced font was proportional to their byte length. Some terminals and editing programs could not deal with double-byte characters starting at odd columns, only even ones (some could not even put double-byte and single-byte characters in the same line). So the DBCS sets generally included Roman characters and digits also, for use alongside the CJK characters in the same line.

On the other hand, early Japanese computing used a single-byte code page called JIS X 0201 for katakana. These would be rendered at the same width as the other single-byte characters, making them half-width kana characters rather than normally proportioned kana. Although the JIS X 0201 standard itself did not specify half-width display for katakana, this became the visually distinguishing feature in Shift JIS between the single-byte JIS X 0201 and double-byte JIS X 0208 katakana. Some IBM code pages used a similar treatment for Korean jamo, based on the N-byte Hangul code and its EBCDIC translation.

== In Unicode ==
For compatibility with existing character sets that contained both half- and fullwidth versions of the same character, Unicode allocated a single block at U+FF00–FFEF containing the necessary "alternative width" characters. This includes a fullwidth version of all the ASCII characters and some non-ASCII punctuation such as the Yen sign, halfwidth versions of katakana and hangul, and halfwidth versions of some other symbols such as circles. Only characters needed for lossless round trip to existing character sets were allocated, rather than (for instance) making a fullwidth version of every Latin accented character.

Unicode assigns every code point an East_Asian_Width property. This may be:

Examples for the Unicode property East_Asian_Width. F, H, and W are generally only used by East Asian scripts.

Unicode character properties based on width
Abbreviation	Name	Description
W	Wide	Naturally wide character, e.g. Hiragana.
Na	Narrow	Naturally narrow character, e.g. ISO Basic Latin alphabet.
F	Fullwidth	Wide variant with compatibility normalisation to naturally narrow character, e.g. fullwidth Latin script.
H	Halfwidth	Narrow variant with compatibility normalisation to naturally wide character, e.g. half-width kana. Includes U+20A9 (₩) as an exception.
A	Ambiguous	Characters included in East Asian DBCS codes but also in European SBCS codes, e.g. Greek alphabet. Duospaced behaviour can consequently vary.
N	Neutral	Characters which do not appear in East Asian DBCS codes, e.g. Devanagari.

Terminal emulators can use this property to decide whether a character should consume one or two "columns" when figuring out tabs and cursor position.

== In OpenType ==
OpenType has the fwid, halt, hwid, and vhal feature tags to be used to reproduce fullwidth or halfwidth form of a character. CSS provides control over these features using font-variant-east-asian and font-feature-settings properties.

== See also ==
- East Asian punctuation
- Em size – full width forms
- Enclosed Alphanumerics – bullet point sequences; some appear as fullwidth (e.g. ⒈, ⓵, ⑴, ⒜, ⓐ)
- Han unification
- Hangul Jamo (Unicode block)
- Katakana (Unicode block)
- Latin script in Unicode
