= Half-width kana =

Katakana displayed at half their normal width

Half-width kana (半角カナ, Hankaku kana) are katakana characters displayed compressed at half their normal width (a 1:2 aspect ratio), instead of the usual square (1:1) aspect ratio. For example, the usual (full-width) form of the katakana ka is カ while the half-width form is ｶ. Additionally, hiragana may be displayed half-width on the Web or in e-books via CSS's font-feature-settings: "hwid" 1 with Adobe-Japan1-6 based OpenType fonts. Finally, half-width kanji is usable on modern computers, and is used in some receipt printers, electric bulletin board and old computers.

Half-width kana were used in the early days of Japanese computing, to allow Japanese characters to be displayed on the same grid as monospaced fonts of Latin characters. Half-width kanji were not used. Half-width kana characters are not generally used today, but find some use in specific settings, such as cash register displays, on shop receipts, Japanese digital television and DVD subtitles, and mailing address labels. Their usage is sometimes also a stylistic choice, particularly frequent in certain Internet slang.

The term "half-width kana", which strictly refers only to how kana are displayed, not how they are stored – is also used loosely to refer to the A0–DF (hexadecimal) block where katakana are stored in some character encodings, such as JIS X 0201 (1969) – see encodings, below. This is formally incorrect, however – this JIS standard simply specifies that katakana can be stored in these locations, without specifying how they should be displayed; the confusion is because in early computing, the characters stored here were in fact displayed as half-width kana – see confusion, below.

== History ==
Half-width kana and 2/3-width kana were used from pre-computer era. In the early computer era, ASCII is defined as a 7-bit character set and has room for 128 characters. However, because this standard was designed for the United States, it does not contain characters and symbols, such as the yen (¥) symbol needed to represent Japanese currency, nor did it include space for characters from other alphabets, such as kana or kanji – thus Japanese characters could not be encoded. Further, Japanese characters, both kana and kanji, are drawn on a square grid, while Latin characters are generally written more narrowly – thus Japanese characters could not be displayed either.

JIS X 0201 was developed in 1969, a time when computers were generally incapable, both by software design and hardware resources, of representing the thousands of Chinese-based kanji characters used in Japanese. As a compromise, this standard encoded katakana (only – not hiragana or kanji) as a small set of characters, assigned in the upper byte value range of 0x80–0xFF. This allowed 8-bit processors to encode and process Japanese text phonetically (as katakana), though without being able to process hiragana or kanji. These katakana characters were in turn displayed as "half-width kana" – a new, unorthodox, narrower form factor to fit the same width as the monospaced Latin alphabets that machines were already printing and displaying. JIS X 0201 is a variant extension of ASCII – it includes additional characters, and does not exactly agree with ASCII on the overlapping part (the Latin character section).

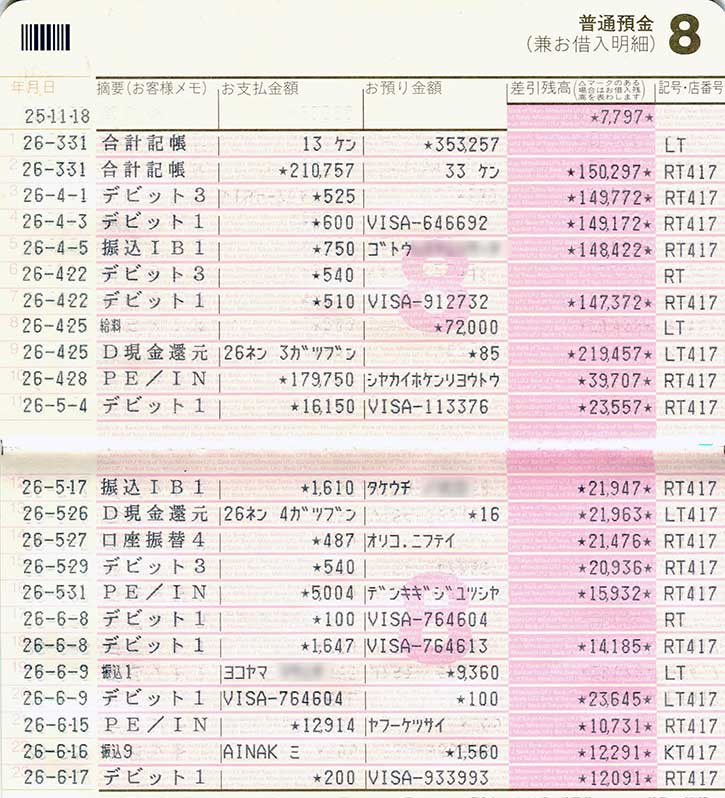
Transaction messages written in half-width kana in a bankbook

Half-width kana were developed as "... the first Japanese characters encoded on computers because they are used for Japanese telegrams." The Nationwide Banking Data Communication System (全国銀行データ通信システム), the largest funds transfer system in Japan, was established in 1973. Transaction messages between banks could only use Latin, numbers, and half-width katakana within 20 characters. The system was superseded by ZEDI (The Nationwide Banking Electronic Data Interchange System) in 2018, which can handle hiragana and kanji with variable length characters.

To make katakana fit into the narrower cell area allowed, some compromises were made. For example, the diacritics dakuten and handakuten are treated as separate characters instead of being part of the preceding character. This compromise led many to consider "half-width kana" visually unattractive, and causes problems for many computer programs today.

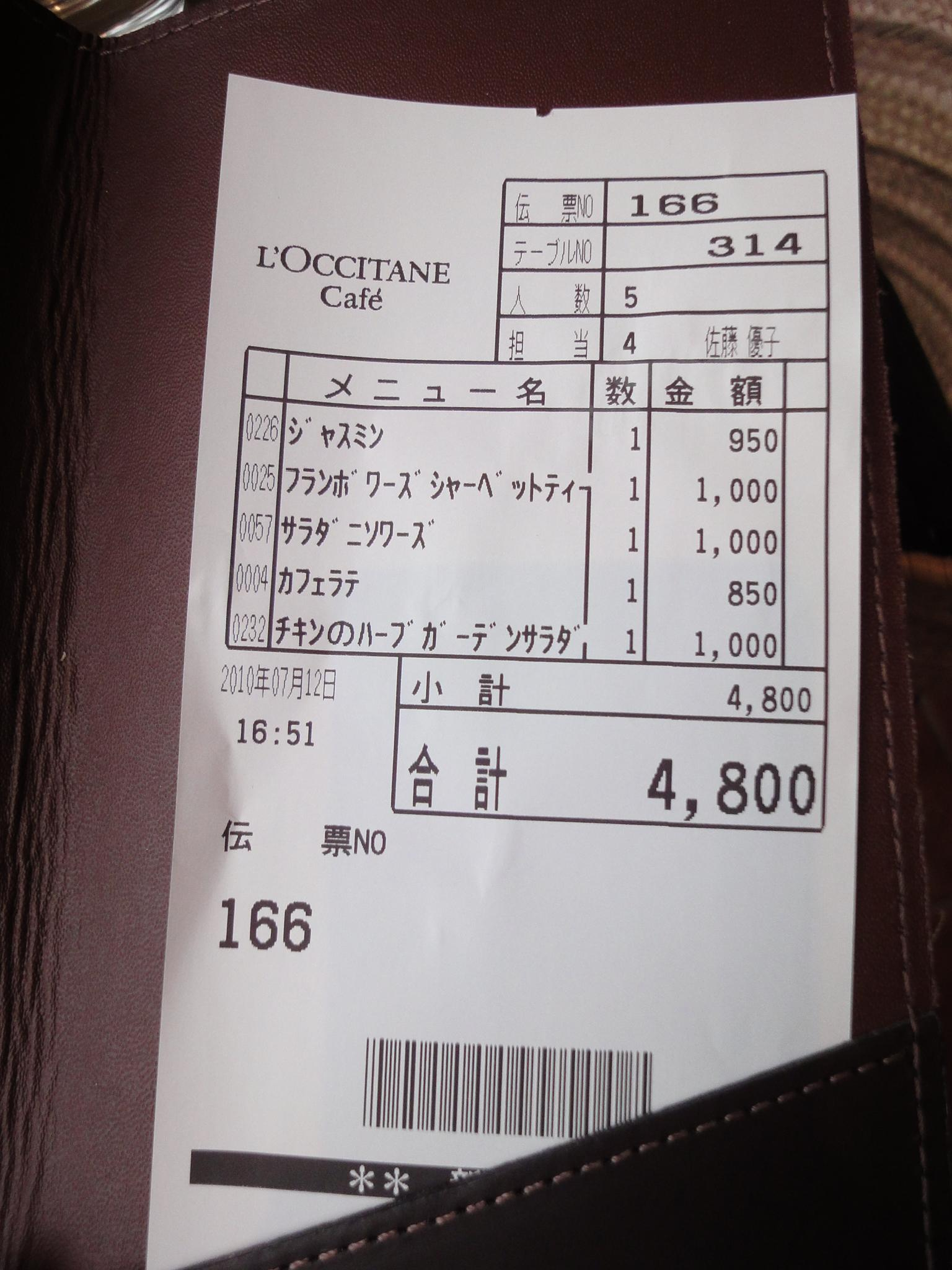
Receipt using half-width kana to save space

Another use of half-width kana is to save space. The Japanese version of Windows 3.1 used both half-width and full-width katakana of MS Gothic in its user interface. The Japanese version of Windows 95 used half-width katakana of MS P Gothic in its user interface. It was replaced by full-width kana of MS UI Gothic, which was present in the Japanese version of Windows 98 and later; a little narrower than MS P Gothic.

== Encoding ==
In the JIS X 0201 specification (1969), katakana are encoded in A0–DF (hexadecimal) block – how they are displayed is not specified, and there is no separate encoding of full-width and half-width kana. In JIS X 0208, katakana, hiragana, and kanji are all encoded (and displayed as full-width characters; there are no half-width characters), though the ordering of the kana is different – see JIS X 0208#Hiragana and katakana.

In Shift JIS, which combines JIS X 0201 and JIS X 0208, these encodings (both of which can encode Latin characters and katakana) are stored separately, with JIS X 0201 all being displayed as half-width (thus the JIS X 0201 katakana are displayed as half-width kana), while JIS X 0208 are all displayed as full-width (thus the JIS X 0208 Latin characters are all displayed as full-width Latin characters). Thus in Shift JIS, Latin characters and katakana have two encodings with two separate display forms, both half-width and full-width.

In Unicode, katakana and hiragana are primarily used as normal, full-width characters, so the Katakana and Hiragana blocks are displayed as full-width characters. A separate block, the Halfwidth and Fullwidth Forms block represents the variant characters, including half-width kana and full-width Latin characters.

Thus, the katakana in JIS X 0201 and the corresponding part of derived encodings (the JIS X 0201 part of Shift JIS) are displayed as half-width, while in Unicode half-width forms are specified separately.

=== Half-width table ===
"J" indicates the first four bits in JIS X 0201 (though see below, these do not necessarily indicate half-width) and in other sets such as Shift JIS, "U" indicates the row in Unicode in the Halfwidth and Fullwidth Forms block.

J	U	0	1	2	3	4	5	6	7	8	9	A	B	C	D	E	F
A	FF6		｡	｢	｣	､	･	ｦ	ｧ	ｨ	ｩ	ｪ	ｫ	ｬ	ｭ	ｮ	ｯ
B	FF7	ｰ	ｱ	ｲ	ｳ	ｴ	ｵ	ｶ	ｷ	ｸ	ｹ	ｺ	ｻ	ｼ	ｽ	ｾ	ｿ
C	FF8	ﾀ	ﾁ	ﾂ	ﾃ	ﾄ	ﾅ	ﾆ	ﾇ	ﾈ	ﾉ	ﾊ	ﾋ	ﾌ	ﾍ	ﾎ	ﾏ
D	FF9	ﾐ	ﾑ	ﾒ	ﾓ	ﾔ	ﾕ	ﾖ	ﾗ	ﾘ	ﾙ	ﾚ	ﾛ	ﾜ	ﾝ	ﾞ	ﾟ

The blank first cell represents a non-existent character in JIS, A0; but a fullwidth double parenthesis ｠ in Unicode, U+FF60.

== Half-width kana on the Internet ==
=== E-mail ===
Since the SMTP and NNTP protocols (used to deliver e-mail and Usenet, respectively) were formerly only able to transmit 7-bit bytes, it was then the convention to use ISO-2022-JP for sending e-mail in Japanese.

Half-width kana is not contained in ISO-2022-JP: it includes the Roman set of JIS X 0201, and all of JIS X 0208, but not the katakana set of JIS X 0201 (which is used for half-width kana in Shift JIS, for instance). Both sets of JIS X 0201 have ISO 2022 codes, but the ISO-2022-JP profile only includes the Roman set: this means that the format for including half-width katakana in ISO-2022-JP is both well-defined and a violation of the ISO-2022-JP format. For this reason, if half-width kana were accidentally included in a message, it could become garbled during transmission (see mojibake). The WHATWG encoding standard used by HTML5 permits decoding, but not encoding, of JIS X 0201 katakana in ISO-2022-JP as an extension to the format, and converts half-width katakana to their JIS X 0208 equivalents upon encoding.

This is no longer such a problem since most e-mail servers today support 8BITMIME extension and hence understand 8-bit characters. Alternatively, an encoding system such as Base64 can be used and specified in the message using MIME.

=== Web pages ===
The problem that exists in e-mail does not exist with Web pages because HTTP accepts 8-bit characters.

However, one problem that does exist is that computer programs have difficulties determining whether to treat a character as Shift JIS, EUC-JP, or UTF-8 – hence character code information should be specified with a HTTP response header or a Meta tag.

== Confusion ==
Strictly speaking, JIS X 0201 encoding as "half-width katakana" is incorrect, as the standard does not define character widths – it defines only the code representation of katakana characters. In the JIS X 0201 standard, katakana characters are printed in normal (full) width, not half-width.

Half-width characters were only used for display during the period when characters were displayed at half-width (and single-byte encodings were used), before full-width character displays (and associated double-byte encodings such as JIS X 0208) became widespread. However, in the Shift JIS standard, which combines the JIS X 0201 standard (whose characters – Latin and katakana – were displayed as half-width) and the JIS X 0208 standard (whose characters – katakana, hiragana, kanji, and Latin – were displayed as full-width), katakana and Latin characters are encoded twice, both in JIS X 0201 and JIS 0208, but displayed as half-width or full-width according to which section they are in (0201 or 0208) – thus the 0201 katakana block can be thought of as corresponding to "half-width kana", and the misunderstanding that the 0201 standard defines "half-width" characters is widespread.

Further, though JIS X 0201 is a single-byte encoding (and displayed at half-width) and JIS X 0208 is a double-byte encoding (and displayed at full-width), there is no connection between number of bytes and width (other than those corresponding in Shift JIS, as above) – for example, Unicode can be encoded with four bytes (UTF-32) to display both full-width and single-width characters.

== See also ==
- Halfwidth and fullwidth forms
- Halfwidth and Fullwidth Forms (Unicode block)
