= Shift JIS =

Japanese character encoding

- MIME / IANA: Shift_JIS
- Alias(es): MS_Kanji, PCK
- Languages: Primarily Japanese, but also supporting English, Russian, Bulgarian, Greek
- Standard: JIS X 0208:1997 Appendix 1
- Classification: Extended ISO 646, (Note: Not in the strictest sense of the term, as ASCII bytes can appear as trail bytes.) variable-width encoding, CJK encoding
- Extends: JIS X 0201 8-bit format
- Transforms / Encodes: JIS X 0208
- Succeeded by: Shift_JIS-2004 (JIS); Windows-31J (web)

Shift JIS (also SJIS, MIME name Shift_JIS, known as PCK in Solaris contexts) is a character encoding for the Japanese language, originally developed by the Japanese company ASCII Corporation (Note: The ASCII Corporation should not be confused with the ASCII encoding used elsewhere in this article.) in conjunction with Microsoft and standardized as JIS X 0208 Appendix 1.

Shift JIS is based on character sets defined within JIS standards JIS X 0201:1997 (for the single-byte characters) and JIS X 0208:1997 (for the double-byte characters).

As of March 2026, 0.05% of surveyed web pages used Shift JIS (actually decoded as its superset Windows-31J encoding), a decline from 1.3% in July 2014. Shift JIS is the third-most declared character encoding for Japanese websites, declared by 1.0% of sites in the .jp domain, while UTF-8 is used by 99.1% of Japanese websites.

Shift JIS is also sometimes used in QR codes, though UTF-8 is often preferred.

== Structure ==
Shift JIS is an extension of the single-byte encoding JIS X 0201:1997, that uses unassigned code points in JIS X 0201 to encode the double-byte JIS X 0208:1997 character set. The lead bytes for the double-byte characters are "shifted" around the 64 halfwidth katakana characters in the single-byte range 0xA1 to 0xDF.

The single-byte characters 0x00 to 0x7F match the ASCII encoding, except for a yen sign (U+00A5) at 0x5C and an overline (U+203E) at 0x7E in place of the ASCII character set's backslash and tilde respectively (these deviations from ASCII align with JIS X 0201). The single-byte characters from 0xA1 to 0xDF map to the half-width katakana characters found in JIS X 0201.

For double-byte characters, the first byte is always in the range 0x81 to 0x9F or the range 0xE0 to 0xEF (these ranges are unassigned in JIS X 0201). If the first byte is odd, the second byte must be in the range 0x40 to 0x9E (but cannot be 0x7F); if the first byte is even, the second byte must in the range 0x9F to 0xFC.

Shift JIS only guarantees that the first byte of two-byte characters will be high-bit-set (0x80–0xFF); the value of the second byte can be either high or low. The appearance of byte values 0x40–0x7E as second bytes of code words makes reliable Shift JIS detection difficult, because the same codes are used for ASCII characters. Since the same byte value can be either first or second byte, string searches are difficult, since simple searches can match the second byte of a character and the first byte of the next, which is not a valid Shift JIS character. String-searching algorithms must be tailor-made for Shift JIS.

=== Compatibility ===
Shift JIS is fully backwards compatible with the JIS X 0201 single-byte encoding, meaning that any valid JIS X 0201 string is also a valid Shift JIS string.

Double-byte characters in JIS X 0208 need to be transformed in order to be encoded in Shift JIS. For a double-byte JIS X 0208 sequence $j_1 j_2$, (Note: In JIS X 0208, j_{1} and j_{2} are each in the range 33 (0x21) to 126 (0x7e) inclusive (i.e., 7-bit character values excluding control characters (0–31 (0x1f) and 127 (0x7f)) and space).) the transformation to the corresponding Shift JIS bytes $s_1 s_2$ is:

$$s_1 = \begin{cases} \left \lfloor \frac{j_1 + 1}{2} \right \rfloor + 112  & \mbox{if } 33 \le j_1 \le 94 \\
\left \lfloor \frac{j_1 + 1}{2} \right \rfloor + 176  & \mbox{if } 95 \le j_1 \le 126             \end{cases}$$
$$s_2 = \begin{cases} j_2 + 31 + \left \lfloor \frac{j_2}{96} \right \rfloor & \mbox{if } j_1 \mbox{ is odd }\\
j_2 + 126 & \mbox{if } j_1 \mbox{ is even }
\end{cases}$$

The competing 8-bit format EUC-JP, which does not support single-byte halfwidth katakana, allows for a cleaner and more direct conversion to and from JIS X 0208 code points, as all high-bit-set bytes are parts of a double-byte character and all codes from ASCII range represent single-byte characters.

== Usage ==
HTML written in Shift JIS can still be interpreted to some extent when incorrectly tagged as ASCII, and when the charset tag is in the top of the document itself, since the important start and end of HTML tags and fields (<, >, /, ", &, ;) are encoded as the same bytes as in ASCII, and those bytes do not appear in two-byte sequences.

Shift JIS can be used in string literals in programming languages such as C (with a Shift JIS editor), but a few things must be taken into consideration. Firstly, that the escape character 0x5C, normally backslash, is the half-width yen sign (¥) in Shift JIS. If the programmer is aware of this, it would be possible to use printf("ハローワールド¥n"); (where ハローワールド is Hello, world and ¥n is an escape sequence), assuming the I/O system supports Shift JIS output. Secondly, the 0x5C byte will cause problems when it appears as second byte of a two-byte character, because it will be interpreted as an escape sequence, which will mess up the interpretation, unless followed by another 0x5C. If the compiler is not aware of Shift JIS, source code needs at compilation to be converted by some tool to a new version. In this version the escape character is escaped itself, if appearing as a second byte of a Shift JIS character and was not intended as a escape character, so that the output when running the code becomes as expected.

== Multiple versions ==
Euler diagram comparing repertoires of JIS X 0208, JIS X 0212, JIS X 0213, Windows-31J, the Microsoft standard repertoire and Unicode

Relationship between Shift_JIS variants on the PC and related encodings, including intersections and other subsets. Names given are descriptive.

Many different versions of Shift JIS exist. There are two areas for expansion:

Firstly, JIS X 0208 does not fill the whole 94×94 space encoded for it in Shift JIS, therefore there is room for more characters here—these are really extensions to JIS X 0208 rather than to Shift JIS itself.

Secondly, Shift JIS has more encoding space than is needed for JIS X 0201 and JIS X 0208 (see § Shift JIS byte map below), and this space can and is used for yet more characters (as either single-byte or double-byte characters).

=== Windows-932 / Windows-31J ===
The most popular extension is Windows code page 932 (a CCSID also used for IBM's extension to Shift JIS), which is registered with the IANA as "Windows-31J", separately from Shift JIS. This was popularized by Microsoft, although Microsoft itself does not recognize the Windows-31J name and instead calls that variation "shift_jis". IBM's code page 943 includes the same double-byte codes as Microsoft's code page 932, while IBM's code page 932 includes fewer extensions (excluding those which Microsoft incorporates from NEC), and retains the character order from the 1978 edition of JIS X 0208, rather than implementing the character variant swaps from the 1983 standard.

Windows-31J assigns 0x5C to U+005C REVERSE SOLIDUS (the backslash), and 0x7E to U+007E TILDE, following US-ASCII. However, most localised fonts on Windows display U+005C as a Yen sign for JIS X 0201 compatibility. It includes several extensions, namely "NEC special characters (Row 13), NEC selection of IBM extensions (Rows 89 to 92), and IBM extensions (Rows 115 to 119)", in addition to setting some encoding space aside for end user definition.

Windows codepage 932 is the version used in the W3C/WHATWG encoding standard used by HTML5, which includes the "formerly proprietary extensions from IBM and NEC" from Windows-31J in its table for JIS X 0208, and also treats the label "shift_jis" interchangeably with "windows-31j" with the intent of being "compatible with deployed content".

=== MacJapanese ===
The version of Shift-JIS originating from the classic Mac OS (known as x-mac-japanese, Code page 10001 or MacJapanese) assigned the tilde to 0x7E (following US-ASCII, not JIS X 0201 which assigns the overline here), but the Yen sign to 0x5C (as in JIS X 0201 and standard Shift JIS). It also extended JIS X 0201 by assigning the backslash to 0x80 (corresponding to 0x5C in US-ASCII), the non-breaking space to 0xA0, the copyright sign to 0xFD, the trademark symbol to 0xFE and the half-width horizontal ellipsis to 0xFF. It also added extended double byte characters; including 53 vertical presentation forms in the Shift_JIS range 0xEB41–0xED96, at 84 JIS rows down from their canonical forms, and 260 special characters in the Shift_JIS range 0x8540–0x886D. This variant was introduced in KanjiTalk version 7.

However, certain Mac OS typefaces used other variants. Sai Mincho and Chu Gothic use a "PostScript" variant of MacJapanese, which included additional vertical presentation forms and a different set of extended special characters, based on the NEC special characters, some of which were only available in the printer versions of the fonts. Older versions of Maru Gothic and Hon Mincho from System 7.1 encoded vertical presentation forms at 10 (not 84) JIS rows down from their canonical forms, and did not include the special character extensions, this was subsequently changed. The typical variant used with KanjiTalk version 6 placed the vertical presentation forms 10 rows down, and also used the NEC extension layout for row 13.

=== Shift_JISx0213 and Shift_JIS-2004 ===
Shift_JIS-2004
- Alias(es): Shift_JISx0213
- Languages: Japanese, Ainu, English, Russian
- Standard: JIS X 0213
- Extends: Shift_JIS (1997), JIS X 0201 (8-bit)
- Transforms / Encodes: JIS X 0213
- Preceded by: Shift_JIS (1997)

The newer JIS X 0213 standard defines an extended variant of Shift_JIS referred to as Shift_JISx0213 (in a previous version of the standard) or Shift_JIS-2004. It is a superset of standard Shift JIS.

In order to represent the allocated rows on both planes of JIS X 0213, Shift_JIS-2004 uses the following method of mapping codepoints.

$$s_1 = \begin{cases} \left \lfloor \frac{k + 257}{2} \right \rfloor & \mbox{if } m = 1 \mbox{ and } 1 \le k \le 62 \\
\left \lfloor \frac{k + 385}{2} \right \rfloor & \mbox{if } m = 1 \mbox{ and } 63 \le k \le 94 \\
\left \lfloor \frac{k + 479}{2} \right \rfloor - \left \lfloor \frac{k}{8} \right \rfloor \times 3 & \mbox{if } m = 2 \mbox{ and } k \in \left\{1, 3, 4, 5, 8, 12, 13, 14, 15\right\} \\
\left \lfloor \frac{k + 411}{2} \right \rfloor & \mbox{if } m = 2 \mbox{ and } 78 \le k \le 94             \end{cases}$$
$$s_2 = \begin{cases} t + 63 & \mbox{if } k \mbox{ is odd and } 1 \le t \le 63 \\
t + 64 & \mbox{if } k \mbox{ is odd and } 64 \le t \le 94 \\
t + 158 & \mbox{if } k \mbox{ is even }
\end{cases}$$

In the above, $s_1 s_2$ is a two-byte Shift_JIS-2004 sequence, $m$ is the plane (面, men) number (1 or 2), $k$ is the row (区, ku) number (1-94) and $t$ is the cell (点, ten) number (1-94). The ku and ten numbers are equivalent to $j_1 - 32$ and $j_2 - 32$ respectively, where $j_1 j_2$ is a two-byte JIS sequence referencing a given plane.

The same set of characters can be represented by EUC-JIS-2004, the EUC-JP based counterpart.

Some of the additions collide with popular Shift JIS extensions, including Windows codepage 932 which is used in web standards (see above). For example, compare plane 1 row 89 in JIS X 0213 (beginning 硃, 硎, 硏...) to row 89 in the JIS X 0208 variant defined in web standards (beginning 纊, 褜, 鍈...). In addition, some of the characters map to Unicode characters beyond the BMP.

=== Other variants ===
The space with lead bytes 0xF5 to 0xF9 (beyond the region used for JIS X 0208) is used by Japanese mobile phone operators for pictographs for use in E-mail. KDDI goes further and defines hundreds more in the space with lead bytes 0xF3 and 0xF4.

Beyond even this, there have been numerous minor variations made on Shift JIS, with individual characters here and there altered. Most of these extensions and variants have no IANA registration, so there is much scope for confusion, if the extensions are used.

A variant is the one that must be used if wanting to encode Shift JIS in source code strings of C and similar programming languages. This variant doubles the byte 0x5C if it appears as second byte of a two-byte character, but not if it appears as a single "¥" (ASCII: "\") character, because 0x5C is the beginning of an escape sequence. The best way of handling this is a special editor which encodes Shift JIS this way.

== Shift JIS byte map ==
=== As defined in JIS X 0208:1997 ===
The chart below gives the detailed meaning of each byte in a stream encoded in standard Shift JIS (conforming to JIS X 0208:1997).

First byte
	0	1	2	3	4	5	6	7	8	9	A	B	C	D	E	F
0x	NUL	SOH	STX	ETX	EOT	ENQ	ACK	BEL	BS	HT	LF	VT	FF	CR	SO	SI
1x	DLE	DC1	DC2	DC3	DC4	NAK	SYN	ETB	CAN	EM	SUB	ESC	FS	GS	RS	US
2x	SP	!	"	#	$	%	&	'	(	)	*	+	,	-	.	/
3x	0	1	2	3	4	5	6	7	8	9	:	;	<		>	?
4x	@	A	B	C	D	E	F	G	H	I	J	K	L	M	N	O
5x	P	Q	R	S	T	U	V	W	X	Y	Z	[	¥ 00A5	]		_
6x	`	a	b	c	d	e	f	g	h	i	j	k	l	m	n	o
7x	p	q	r	s	t	u	v	w	x	y	z	{	|	}	‾ 203E	DEL
8x																
9x																
Ax		｡ FF61	｢ FF62	｣ FF63	､ FF64	･ FF65	ｦ FF66	ｧ FF67	ｨ FF68	ｩ FF69	ｪ FF6A	ｫ FF6B	ｬ FF6C	ｭ FF6D	ｮ FF6E	ｯ FF6F
Bx	ｰ FF70	ｱ FF71	ｲ FF72	ｳ FF73	ｴ FF74	ｵ FF75	ｶ FF76	ｷ FF77	ｸ FF78	ｹ FF79	ｺ FF7A	ｻ FF7B	ｼ FF7C	ｽ FF7D	ｾ FF7E	ｿ FF7F
Cx	ﾀ FF80	ﾁ FF81	ﾂ FF82	ﾃ FF83	ﾄ FF84	ﾅ FF85	ﾆ FF86	ﾇ FF87	ﾈ FF88	ﾉ FF89	ﾊ FF8A	ﾋ FF8B	ﾌ FF8C	ﾍ FF8D	ﾎ FF8E	ﾏ FF8F
Dx	ﾐ FF90	ﾑ FF91	ﾒ FF92	ﾓ FF93	ﾔ FF94	ﾕ FF95	ﾖ FF96	ﾗ FF97	ﾘ FF98	ﾙ FF99	ﾚ FF9A	ﾛ FF9B	ﾜ FF9C	ﾝ FF9D	ﾞ FF9E	ﾟ FF9F
Ex																
Fx																

Second byte
	0	1	2	3	4	5	6	7	8	9	A	B	C	D	E	F
0x																
1x																
2x																
3x																
4x																
5x																
6x																
7x																
8x																
9x																
Ax																
Bx																
Cx																
Dx																
Ex																
Fx																

Non printable ASCII character
Unaltered ASCII character
Modified ASCII character
Single-byte half-width katakana
First byte of a double-byte JIS X 0208 character
Unused as first byte of a JIS X 0208 character
Second byte of a double-byte JIS X 0208 character whose first half of the JIS sequence was odd
Second byte of a double-byte JIS X 0208 character whose first half of the JIS sequence was even
Unused as second byte of a JIS X 0208 character

=== With vendor or JIS X 0213 extensions ===
Some of the bytes which are not used for single-byte codes or initial bytes in JIS X 0208:1997 are used by certain extensions, resulting in the layout detailed in the chart below.

First byte
	0	1	2	3	4	5	6	7	8	9	A	B	C	D	E	F
0	␀	␁	␂	␃	␄	␅	␆	␇	␈	␉	␊	␋	␌	␍	␎	␏
1	␐	␑	␒	␓	␔	␕	␖	␗	␘	␙	␚	␛	␜	␝	␞	␟
2	␠	!	"	#	$	%	&	'	(	)	*	+	,	-	.	/
3	0	1	2	3	4	5	6	7	8	9	:	;	<	=	>	?
4	@	A	B	C	D	E	F	G	H	I	J	K	L	M	N	O
5	P	Q	R	S	T	U	V	W	X	Y	Z	[	¥	]	^	_
6	`	a	b	c	d	e	f	g	h	i	j	k	l	m	n	o
7	p	q	r	s	t	u	v	w	x	y	z	{	|	}	‾	␡
8
9
A		｡	｢	｣	､	･	ｦ	ｧ	ｨ	ｩ	ｪ	ｫ	ｬ	ｭ	ｮ	ｯ
B	ｰ	ｱ	ｲ	ｳ	ｴ	ｵ	ｶ	ｷ	ｸ	ｹ	ｺ	ｻ	ｼ	ｽ	ｾ	ｿ
C	ﾀ	ﾁ	ﾂ	ﾃ	ﾄ	ﾅ	ﾆ	ﾇ	ﾈ	ﾉ	ﾊ	ﾋ	ﾌ	ﾍ	ﾎ	ﾏ
D	ﾐ	ﾑ	ﾒ	ﾓ	ﾔ	ﾕ	ﾖ	ﾗ	ﾘ	ﾙ	ﾚ	ﾛ	ﾜ	ﾝ	ﾞ	ﾟ
E
F

Second byte
	0	1	2	3	4	5	6	7	8	9	A	B	C	D	E	F
0
1
2
3
4
5
6
7
8
9
A
B
C
D
E
F

Non printable ASCII character
Unaltered ASCII character
Modified ASCII character
Single-byte half-width katakana
First byte of a double-byte character, used by JIS X 0208 (and by extensions such as JIS X 0213 plane 1)
First byte of a double-byte character, unallocated in JIS X 0208 but used by JIS X 0213 plane 1 or by vendor extensions
First byte of a double-byte character beyond JIS X 0208, used for JIS X 0213 plane 2 or for unrelated extensions
Not used as first byte, used by some single byte extensions
Second byte of a double-byte character whose first half of the JIS sequence was odd
Second byte of a double-byte character whose first half of the JIS sequence was even
Unused as second byte of a double-byte character

== See also ==
- Japanese language and computers
- Code page 932 (Microsoft Windows)
- Mojibake
- Shift JIS art
