= CJK Symbols and Punctuation =

Group of Unicode symbols

- Range: U+3000..U+303F (64 code points)
- Plane: BMP
- Scripts: Han (15 char.); Hangul (2 char.); Common (43 char.); Inherited (4 char.)
- Assigned: 64 code points
- Unused: 0 reserved code points

Unicode version history
- 1.0.0 (1991): 56 (+56)
- 1.0.1 (1992): 56 (+0)
- 1.1 (1993): 57 (+1)
- 3.0 (1999): 61 (+4)
- 3.2 (2002): 64 (+3)

Unicode documentation
- Code chart ∣ Web page
- Note: In Unicode 1.0.1, during the process of unifying with ISO 10646, the "IDEOGRAPHIC DITTO MARK" (仝) was unified with the unified ideograph at U+4EDD, allowing the Japanese Industrial Standard symbol to be moved from U+32FF in the Enclosed CJK Letters and Months block to the vacated code point at U+3004.

CJK Symbols and Punctuation is a Unicode block containing symbols and punctuation used for writing the Chinese, Japanese and Korean languages. It also contains one Chinese character.

== Block ==
CJK Symbols and Punctuation^{[1]} Official Unicode Consortium code chart (PDF)
	0	1	2	3	4	5	6	7	8	9	A	B	C	D	E	F
U+300x	ID; SP	、	。	〃	〄	々	〆	〇	〈	〉	《	》	「	」	『	』
U+301x	【	】	〒	〓	〔	〕	〖	〗	〘	〙	〚	〛	〜	〝	〞	〟
U+302x	〠	〡	〢	〣	〤	〥	〦	〧	〨	〩	〪	〫	〬	〭	〮	〯
U+303x	〰	〱	〲	〳	〴	〵	〶	〷	〸	〹	〺	〻	〼	〽	〾	〿
Notes: 1. As of Unicode version 17.0

The block has variation sequences defined for East Asian punctuation positional variants. They use U+FE00 VARIATION SELECTOR-1 (VS01) and U+FE01 VARIATION SELECTOR-2 (VS02):

Variation sequences for punctuation alignment
U+	3001	3002	Description
base code point	、	。	
base + VS01	、︀	。︀	corner-justified form
base + VS02	、︁	。︁	centered form

== Orientation ==
Quotation marks and other punctuation have expected differences in behaviour in vertical and horizontal text. The quotation marks 「...」, 『...』 and 〝...〟 rotate 90 degrees, as follows:

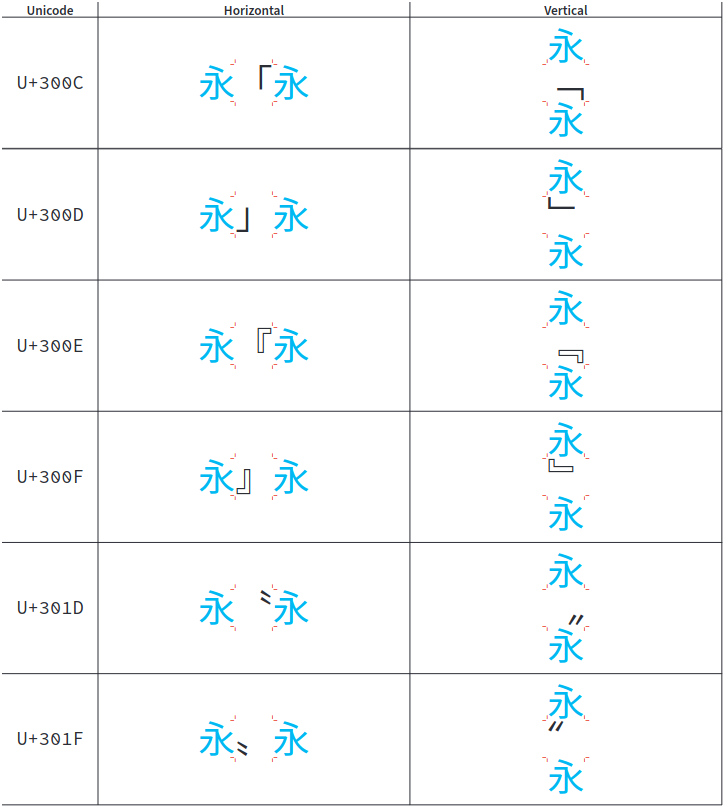
Expected behaviour of CJK quotation marks in vertical and horizontal text. The red registration corners mark the glyph metrics and show how the glyph aligns within the em-box of a CJK character.

See also General Punctuation, for variation selectors and CJK behaviour of the Latin quotation marks ‘...’ and “...”.

== Chinese character ==
The CJK Symbols and Punctuation block contains one Chinese character: U+3007 〇 IDEOGRAPHIC NUMBER ZERO. Although it is not covered under "Unified Ideographs", it is treated as a CJK character for all other intents and purposes.

== Emoji ==
The CJK Symbols and Punctuation block contains two emoji: U+3030 and U+303D.

The block has four standardized variants defined to specify emoji-style (U+FE0F VS16) or text presentation (U+FE0E VS15) for the two emoji, both of which default to a text presentation.

Emoji variation sequences
U+	3030	303D
base code point	〰	〽
base+VS15 (text)	〰︎	〽︎
base+VS16 (emoji)	〰️	〽️

== History ==
In Unicode 1.0.1, two changes were made to this block in order to make Unicode 1.0.1 a proper subset of ISO 10646:

- U+3004 IDEOGRAPHIC DITTO MARK was merged with U+4EDD (仝) in the CJK Unified Ideographs block, freeing up code point U+3004
- U+32FF JAPANESE INDUSTRIAL STANDARD SYMBOL was moved from the Enclosed CJK Letters and Months block to U+3004 (〄)

The following Unicode-related documents record the purpose and process of defining specific characters in the CJK Symbols and Punctuation block:

Version	Final code points (Note: Proposed code points and characters names may differ from final code points and names)	Count	L2 ID	WG2 ID	IRG ID	Document
1.0.0	U+3000..3003, 3005..3037, 303F	56				(to be determined)
1.0.0	U+3000..3003, 3005..3037, 303F	56	L2/11-402			Iancu, Laurențiu (2011-10-20), Proposal to change the General_Category of Hangul tone marks U+302E and U+302F
1.0.0	U+3000..3003, 3005..3037, 303F	56	L2/14-198	N4606		Komatsu, Hiroyuki (2014-08-06), Proposal for the modification of the sample character layout of WAVE_DASH (U+301C)
1.0.0	U+3000..3003, 3005..3037, 303F	56	L2/14-177			Moore, Lisa (2014-10-17), "WAVE_DASH (B.15.3)", UTC #140 Minutes
1.0.0	U+3000..3003, 3005..3037, 303F	56	L2/16-052	N4603 (pdf, doc)		Umamaheswaran, V. S. (2015-09-01), "M63.11v", Unconfirmed minutes of WG 2 meeting 63, "Reverse the shape of current glyph for 301C WAVE DASH as requested in document N4606"
1.0.0	U+3000..3003, 3005..3037, 303F	56	L2/17-056			Lunde, Ken (2017-02-13), Proposal to add standardized variation sequences
1.0.0	U+3000..3003, 3005..3037, 303F	56	L2/17-436			Lunde, Ken (2018-01-21), Proposal to add standardized variation sequences for fullwidth East Asian punctuation
1.0.0	U+3000..3003, 3005..3037, 303F	56	L2/18-039			Anderson, Deborah; Whistler, Ken; Pournader, Roozbeh; Moore, Lisa; Liang, Hai; Cook, Richard (2018-01-19), "24. Fullwidth East Asian Punctuation", Recommendations to UTC #154 January 2018 on Script Proposals
1.0.0	U+3000..3003, 3005..3037, 303F	56	L2/18-115			Moore, Lisa (2018-05-09), "Consensus 154-C17", UTC #155 Minutes, "Add 16 standardized variation sequences based on L2/17-436R, for Unicode 12.0."
1.0.0	U+3000..3003, 3005..3037, 303F	56	L2/23-167			Koo, Night (2023-07-01), Proposal to update representative glyph of U+3029 SUZHOU NUMERAL NINE
1.0.0	U+3000..3003, 3005..3037, 303F	56	L2/23-227			Chan, Eiso (2023-10-07), Feedback on L2/23-167 (Proposal to update representative glyph of U+3029 SUZHOU NUMERAL NINE)
1.0.0	U+3000..3003, 3005..3037, 303F	56	L2/23-237R			Lunde, Ken (2023-11-02), "14 [Affects U+3029]", CJK & Unihan Group Recommendations for UTC #177 Meeting
1.0.0	U+3000..3003, 3005..3037, 303F	56	L2/23-231			Constable, Peter (2023-12-08), "Section 14 [Affects U+3029]", UTC #177 Minutes
1.0.0	U+3000..3003, 3005..3037, 303F	56	L2/23-281			Koo, Night (2023-11-28), Update Suzhou numerals in CJK Symbols font (GitHub issue) [Affects U+3021-3029]
1.0.0	U+3000..3003, 3005..3037, 303F	56	L2/24-012			Lunde, Ken (2024-01-11), "19 [Affects U+3021-3029]", CJK & Unihan Group Recommendations for UTC #178 Meeting
1.0.0	U+3000..3003, 3005..3037, 303F	56	L2/24-006			Constable, Peter (2024-01-31), "Section 19 [Affects U+3021-3029]", UTC #178 Minutes
1.0.1	U+3004	1				(to be determined)
3.0	U+3038..303A	3	L2/97-017	N1182	N202	Proposal to add 210 KangXi Radicals and 3 HANGZHOU Numbers in BMP for compatibility, 1995-03-23
3.0	U+3038..303A	3		N1203		Umamaheswaran, V. S.; Ksar, Mike (1995-05-03), "6.1.11", Unconfirmed minutes of SC2/WG2 Meeting 27, Geneva
3.0	U+3038..303A	3		N1303 (html, doc)		Umamaheswaran, V. S.; Ksar, Mike (1996-01-26), Minutes of Meeting 29, Tokyo
3.0	U+3038..303A	3	L2/97-284	N1629	N486	Zhang, Zhoucai (1997-07-07), Kangxi Radicals and Hangzhou Numerals
3.0	U+3038..303A	3	L2/97-255R			Aliprand, Joan (1997-12-03), "4.B.1 Hangzhou Numerals", Approved Minutes – UTC #73 & L2 #170 joint meeting, Palo Alto, CA – August 4-5, 1997, "Motion [#73-M9]: That the UTC concurs with SC2/WG2 Resolution M32.11, and accepts the 3 Hangzhou numeral characters."
3.0	U+3038..303A	3	L2/98-112	N1629R		Zhang, Zhoucai (1998-03-19), Kangxi Radicals, Hangzhou Numerals
3.0	U+3038..303A	3	L2/98-332	N1923		Combined PDAM registration and consideration ballot on WD for ISO/IEC 10646-1/Amd. 15, AMENDMENT 15: Kang Xi radicals and CJK radicals supplement, 1998-10-28
3.0	U+3038..303A	3	L2/99-073	N1968 (html, doc)		Summary of Voting on SC 2 N 3213, PDAM ballot on WD for 10646-1/Amd. 15: Kang Xi radicals and CJK radicals supplement, 1999-02-08
3.0	U+3038..303A	3	L2/99-119			Text for FPDAM ballot of ISO/IEC 10646, Amd. 15 - Kang Xi radicals and CJK radicals supplement, 1999-04-07
3.0	U+3038..303A	3	L2/99-232	N2003		Umamaheswaran, V. S. (1999-08-03), "6.1.1 PDAM15 - Kang Xi & CJK Radicals", Minutes of WG 2 meeting 36, Fukuoka, Japan, 1999-03-09--15
3.0	U+3038..303A	3	L2/99-252	N2065		Summary of Voting on SC 2 N 3311, ISO 10646-1/FPDAM 15 - Kang Xi radicals and CJK radicals supplement, 1999-08-19
3.0	U+3038..303A	3	L2/99-300	N2122		Paterson, Bruce (1999-09-21), Revised Text for FDAM ballot of ISO/IEC 10646-1/FDAM 15, AMENDMENT 15: Kang Xi radicals and CJK radicals supplement
3.0	U+3038..303A	3	L2/00-044			Summary of FDAM voting: ISO 10646 Amendment 15: Kang Xi radicals and CJK radicals supplement, 2000-01-31
3.0	U+3038..303A	3	L2/23-281			Koo, Night (2023-11-28), "19:none", Update Suzhou numerals in CJK Symbols font (GitHub issue)
3.0	U+3038..303A	3	L2/24-012			Lunde, Ken (2024-01-11), "19", CJK & Unihan Group Recommendations for UTC #178 Meeting
3.0	U+3038..303A	3	L2/24-006			Constable, Peter (2024-01-31), "Section 19", UTC #178 Minutes
3.0	U+303E	1		N1431	N406	Ideographic Variation Mark, 1996-06-27
3.0	U+303E	1		N1453		Ksar, Mike; Umamaheswaran, V. S. (1996-12-06), "9.7 Ideographic Variation Mark", WG 2 Minutes - Quebec Meeting 31
3.0	U+303E	1	L2/97-023	N1486	N437	Resolutions of IRG Meeting #8, 1997-01-16
3.0	U+303E	1		N1489		Supplement to Ideographic Components and Composition Schemes, 1997-01-16
3.0	U+303E	1		N1490	N436	"Response related to N1431 (Ideographic Variation Mark)", Response to WG2 question on Ideographic Structure Characters, 1997-01-16
3.0	U+303E	1	L2/97-024	N1491		IRG proposal: Ideographic variant character, 1997-01-19
3.0	U+303E	1	L2/97-030	N1503 (pdf, doc)		Umamaheswaran, V. S.; Ksar, Mike (1997-04-01), "9.5", Unconfirmed Minutes of WG 2 Meeting #32, Singapore; 1997-01-20--24
3.0	U+303E	1	L2/97-114	N1544 (html, doc)	N453	Sato, T. K. (1997-04-08), Questions on the "Han structure method" described in WG2 N1490 (IRG N436)
3.0	U+303E	1		N1678 (pdf, doc)		Further explanation on Variation Mark, 1997-12-18
3.0	U+303E	1	L2/98-100	N1728		Ad-hoc report on ideographic variation indicator, 1998-03-18
3.0	U+303E	1	L2/98-158			Aliprand, Joan; Winkler, Arnold (1998-05-26), "Ideographic Variation Indicator", Draft Minutes – UTC #76 & NCITS Subgroup L2 #173 joint meeting, Tredyffrin, Pennsylvania, April 20-22, 1998
3.0	U+303E	1	L2/98-286	N1703		Umamaheswaran, V. S.; Ksar, Mike (1998-07-02), "9.3", Unconfirmed Meeting Minutes, WG 2 Meeting #34, Redmond, WA, USA; 1998-03-16--20
3.0	U+303E	1	L2/98-321	N1905		Revised text of 10646-1/FPDAM 23, AMENDMENT 23: Bopomofo Extended and other characters, 1998-10-22
3.0	U+303E	1	L2/23-281			Koo, Night (2023-11-28), Update Suzhou numerals in CJK Symbols font (GitHub issue)
3.0	U+303E	1	L2/24-012			Lunde, Ken (2024-01-11), "19", CJK & Unihan Group Recommendations for UTC #178 Meeting
3.0	U+303E	1	L2/24-006			Constable, Peter (2024-01-31), "Section 19", UTC #178 Minutes
3.2	U+303B..303D	3	L2/99-238			Consolidated document containing 6 Japanese proposals, 1999-07-15
3.2	U+303B..303D	3		N2092		Addition of forty eight characters, 1999-09-13
3.2	U+303B..303D	3	L2/00-024			Shibano, Kohji (2000-01-31), JCS proposal revised
3.2	U+303B..303D	3	L2/00-098, L2/00-098-page5	N2195		Rationale for non-Kanji characters proposed by JCS committee, 2000-03-15
3.2	U+303B..303D	3	L2/00-234	N2203 (rtf, txt)		Umamaheswaran, V. S. (2000-07-21), "8.20", Minutes from the SC2/WG2 meeting in Beijing, 2000-03-21 -- 24
3.2	U+303B..303D	3	L2/00-298	N2258		Sato, T. K. (2000-09-04), JIS X 0213 symbols part-2
3.2	U+303B..303D	3	L2/00-342	N2278		Sato, T. K.; Everson, Michael; Whistler, Ken; Freytag, Asmus (2000-09-20), Ad hoc Report on Japan feedback N2257 and N2258
3.2	U+303B..303D	3	L2/01-050	N2253		Umamaheswaran, V. S. (2001-01-21), "7.16 JIS X0213 Symbols", Minutes of the SC2/WG2 meeting in Athens, September 2000
3.2	U+303B..303D	3	L2/01-114	N2328		Summary of Voting on SC 2 N 3503, ISO/IEC 10646-1: 2000/PDAM 1, 2001-03-09
3.2	U+303B..303D	3	L2/11-438 (Note: See also L2/10-458, L2/11-414, L2/11-415, and L2/11-429) (Note: Refer to the history section of the Miscellaneous Symbols and Pictographs block for additional emoji-related documents)	N4182		Edberg, Peter (2011-12-22), Emoji Variation Sequences (Revision of L2/11-429)

== See also ==
- Hangul Jamo (Unicode block)
- Ideographic Symbols and Punctuation
- Chinese punctuation
