= Ryakuji =

Form of shorthand for writing kanji

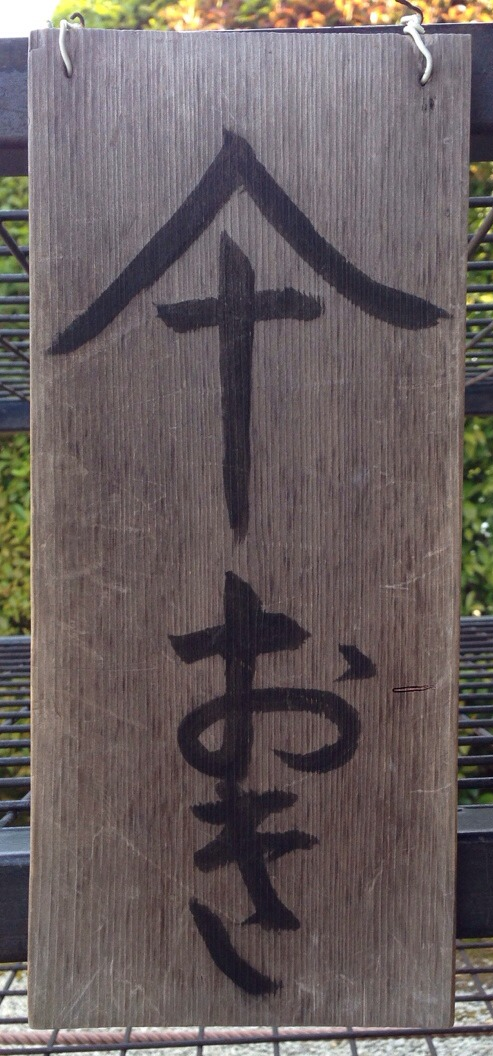
Sign reading "umbrella stand" (仐おき, kasa-oki, standard form 傘おき, showing ryakuji form of 傘: 仐 (人 + 十), with inner 人 omitted. Compare simplified Chinese 伞.

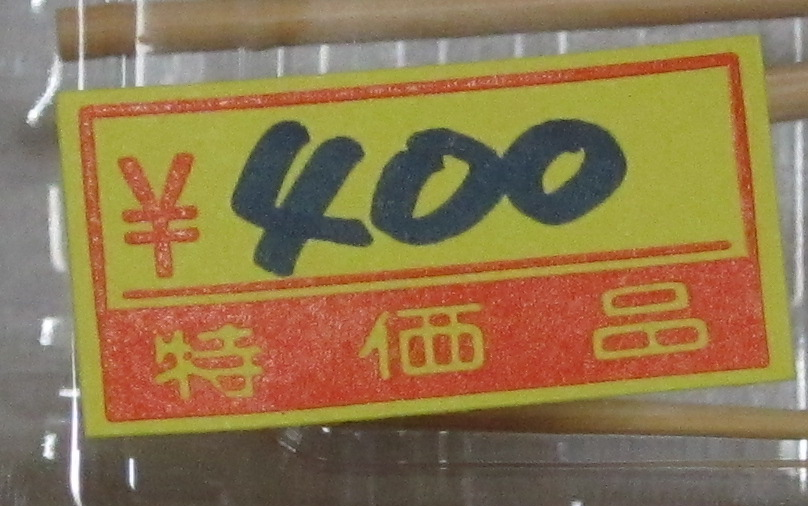
Price tag reading ¥400, 特価品 (bargain item), showing ryakuji form of 品, with bottom squares connected

In Japanese language, Ryakuji (Japanese: 略字 "abbreviated characters", or 筆写略字 hissha ryakuji, meaning "handwritten abbreviated characters") are colloquial simplifications of kanji.

== Status ==
Ryakuji are not covered in the Kanji Kentei, nor are they officially recognized (most ryakuji are not present in Unicode). However, some abbreviated forms of hyōgaiji (表外字, characters not included in the tōyō or jōyō kanji lists) included in the JIS standards which conform to the shinjitai simplifications are included in Level pre-1 and above of the Kanji Kentei (e.g., 餠→餅, 摑→掴), as well as some other allowances for alternate ways of writing radicals and alternate forms. Some ryakuji were adopted as shinjitai.

Some simplifications are commonly used as special Japanese typographic symbols. These include:

- 々, the kanji iteration mark, from 仝, a variant of 同;
- 〻, the vertical form, from 二;
- the hiragana and katakana iteration marks, ゝ and ヽ, generic strokes;
- 〆, shime, simplification of 占 (as 占め しめ shime) as cursive form of top component ト, used for various kanji read as しめ shime, primarily 締め, also 閉め, 絞め, 搾め, and original 占め;
- ヶ, small ke, simplification of 箇 (also used for 個), though with other uses.

Of these, only 〆 for 締 and ヶ for 箇 are generally recognized as being simplifications of kanji characters.

Replacements of complex characters by simpler standard characters (whether related or not) is instead a different phenomenon, kakikae. For example, in writing 年齢43歳 as 年令43才 (nenrei 43 sai "age 43 years"), 齢 is replaced by the component 令 and 歳 is replaced by 才, in both cases with the same pronunciation but different meanings. The replacement of 齢 by 令 is a graphic simplification (keeping the phonetic), while 歳 and 才 are graphically unrelated, but in both cases this is simply considered a replacement character, not a simplified form. Other examples include simplifying 醤油 shōyu (soy sauce) to 正油.

Compare this to simplified Chinese.

== Use ==
Ryakuji are primarily used in individual memos, notes and other such forms of handwriting. Their use has declined in recent years, possibly due to the emergence of computer technology and advanced input methods that allow equally fast input of both simple and complex characters. Despite this, the ryakuji for 門 (mon, kado; gate) and for characters using the radical 門 are still widely used in handwriting.

== Abbreviations for multiple-character words or phrases ==
In all cases discussed in the other sections of this article, individual characters are simplified, but separate characters are not merged. There are rare cases of single-character abbreviations for multiple-character words or phrases, such as 圕 for 圖書館, 図書館 toshokan, "library", but this is very unusual; see polysyllabic Chinese characters for this phenomenon in Chinese, where it is more common.

== Examples ==
Some widely used ryakuji

=== Notes ===
Of these, several are commonly seen in signs: 門 (2), 品 (12), 器 (12) are very commonly seen, particularly simplifying 間 in store signs, while 第 (1) and 曜 (5) are also relatively common, as is 𩵋 for 魚 (as in 点 (3)). Other characters are less commonly seen in public, instead being primarily found in private writing.

- 1 and 2. (第, 門 – These are perhaps the most commonly used Ryakuji. 1 (dai, ordinal prefix) is present in Unicode as U+3427 (㐧), but is not supported by the MS Gothic or Mincho family of typefaces, or Arial Unicode MS. According to the original Japanese article, 1 has been seen on roadsigns on the Keihin #3 Road (㐧三京浜道路, Dai-San Keihin Dōro). 2 is present in Unicode as U+95E8; it is unified with the closely related Simplified Chinese abbreviation 门 (both originated from cursive script forms). The Japanese form may be explicitly induced with the sequence U+95E8 U+E0100.
- 3. (点) – An abbreviation of the bottom four dots in the character 点 is present in Unicode as 奌 U+594C, but is not supported by the MS Gothic or MS Mincho typefaces. It does appear in Arial Unicode, Sim Sun, Sim Hei, MingLiU, KaiU and New Gulim typefaces. Another simplification of this sort can be seen for the bottom four dots of 魚 (present in Unicode as 𩵋 U+29D4B). The bottom of the characters 熱 and 馬, however, are simplified instead using a horizontal line, as in the Simplified Chinese characters 马 and 鱼.
- 4. (職) (variant 1 is present in Unicode as 耺 U+803A; variant 2 is 𫟉 U+2B7C9) – Also used often, but somehow not applied to the related characters 織 and 識.
- 5. (曜) 𫞂 (U+2B782) (⿰日玉, from 曜 = ⿰日翟) – Also often written as 旺 (originally a different character), but the dot (as in 玉) is used to distinguish. Common abbreviation in stores for days of week. The phonetic 翟 is generally not abbreviated to 玉 in other characters such as 濯, 擢, 櫂, 躍, 燿, or 耀.
- 6. (前) – Grass script form (1 and 2 also originated from grass script forms)
- 7. (個) (present in Unicode as 㐰 U+3430) – Abbreviated by removing the contents of the kunigamae (固) component. There is also the 囗 (U+56D7) abbreviation for 国.
- 8 and 10. (選 機, not present in Unicode) – A portion at the top consisting of two or more consecutive characters is changed to a ⺍ shape. This can be seen in the Shinjitai simplifications 榮→栄, 單→単, 嚴→厳, 巢→巣, 學→学. The 竹 top radical has also been used (although rarely). A colloquial simplification for 機 exists (not present in Unicode) in which the right portion is replaced by katakana キ (ki) to indicate the on reading.
- 9. (濾) (present in Unicode as 沪 U+6CAA) – Not as common a character, but a major ryakuji in scientific circles, as it is used in such words as 濾過 (roka, percolation). This character has also been seen in print. The component 盧, pronounced RO just like 慮, is commonly simplified to 戸 as well such as in 蘆→芦 and the Shinjitai simplification 爐→炉.
- 11. 闘 to 閗 (⿵門斗) or simply 斗 (in Unicode at U+9597). The complicated character 闘 (tō) is replaced by a simpler character of the same On reading, 斗. This is formally known as kakikae, if one standard character is replaced by another standard character of the same reading, though hybrids such as 閗 (門斗) are ryakuji. Another example of kakikae is 年齢43歳→年令43才 (nenrei 43 sai "age 43 years"), and simplifications of this method have also been seen in print.
- 12. (品, 器) (present in Unicode as 𠯮 U+20BEE) – Also commonly seen. The bottom 吅 portion of 品 is merged. Examples have also been seen in characters such as 靈 (the Kyūjitai of 霊) in which the 𠱠 portion has been merged.
- 13. 魔, 摩 (not present in Unicode) – A colloquial simplification in which katakana マ (ma) is used to indicate the on reading of both characters (ma). The simplification for 魔 is seen in manga, and the simplification for 摩 is commonly seen when writing place names such as Tama, Tokyo (多摩市).

== Further examples ==
Omitting components is a general principle, and the resulting character is often not a standard character, as in 傘→仐.

If the resulting character is a standard character with the same reading (common if keeping the phonetic), this is properly kakikae instead, but if it is simply a graphic simplification (with a different reading) or the resulting character is not standard, this is ryakuji. One of the most common examples is 巾 for 幅 haba "width". Often the result would be ambiguous in isolation, but is understandable from context. This is particularly common in familiar compounds, such as in the following examples:

- 齢→令 in 年齢→年令
- 歴→厂 in 歴史→厂史
- 経→圣 in 経済→圣済

In some cases, a component has been simplified when part of other characters, but has not been simplified in isolation, or has been simplified in some characters but not others. In that case, simplifying it in isolation can be used as common ryakuji. For example, 卒 is used in isolation, but in compounds has been simplified to 卆, such as 醉 to 酔. Using 卆 in isolation, such as when writing 新卒 shin-sotsu "newly graduated" as 新卆, is unofficial ryakuji. As another example, 專 has been simplified to 云 in some characters, such as 傳 to 伝, but only to 専 in isolation or other characters. Thus simplifying the 専 in 薄 (bottom part 溥) to 云 is found in ryakuji.

More unusual examples come from calligraphic abbreviations, or more formally from printed forms of calligraphic forms: a standard character is first written in a calligraphic (草書, grass script) form, then this is converted back to print script (楷書) in a simplified form. This is the same principle as graphical simplifications such as 學→学, and of various simplifications above, such as 第→㐧. A conspicuous informal example is 喜→㐂 (3 copies of the character for 7: 七), which is rather frequently seen on store signs. Other examples include 鹿→𢈘; and replacing the center of 風 with two 丶, as in the bottom of 冬. 御 has various such simplifications. In Niigata (新潟), the second character 潟 is rare and complex, and is thus simplified as 潟→泻（氵写）.

=== Derived characters ===
Derived characters accordingly also have derived ryakuji, as in these characters derived from 門:

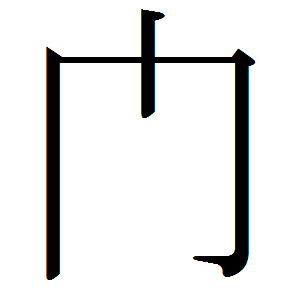
門

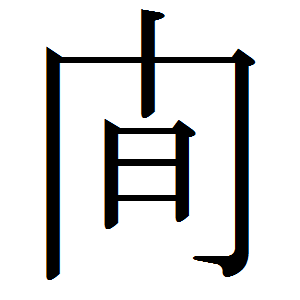
間

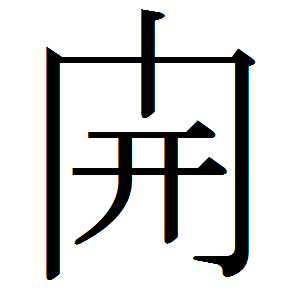
開

Similarly, the 魚→𩵋 simplification is often used in fish compounds, such as 鮨 sushi, particularly in signs.

=== Phonetic simplifications ===
Some ryakuji are simplified phono-semantic characters, retaining a radical as semantic and replacing the rest of the character with a katakana phonetic for the on reading, e.g., 議 (20 strokes) may be simplified as 言 (semantic) + ギ (phonetic gi for on reading):

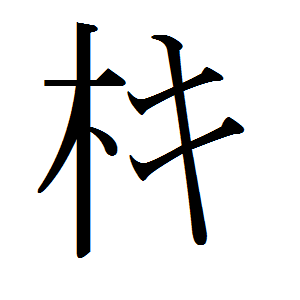
機 → 木 + キ ki

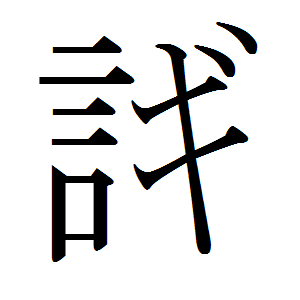
議 → 言 + ギ gi

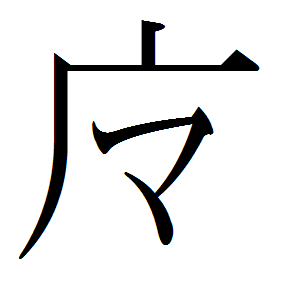
魔、摩 → 广 + マ ma

Another example is 層 sō, replacing the 曽 by ソ so.

This may also be done using Latin characters; for example, the character 憲 (as used in 憲法 kenpō, "constitution") may be simplified to "宀K": the radical 宀 placed over the letter K; this is particularly common in law school. Similarly, 慶應 (Keiō) as in Keio University may be simplified to "" or even further simplified to "": the letters K and O respectively placed inside the radical 广. In this case the pronunciation of "KO" (as an initialism) sounds like the actual name "Keiō", hence the use.

The character 機 has a number of ryakuji, as it is a commonly used character with many strokes (16 strokes); in addition to the above phono-semantic simplification, it also has a number of purely graphical simplifications:

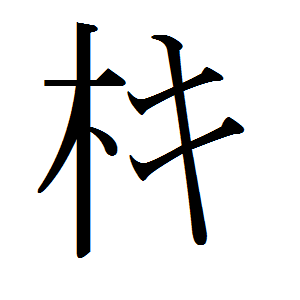
木 + キ

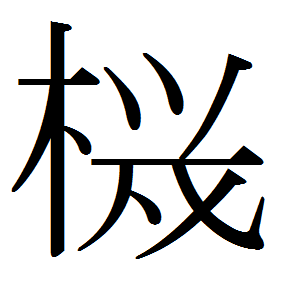

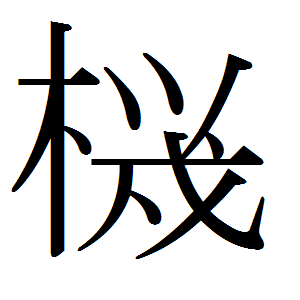

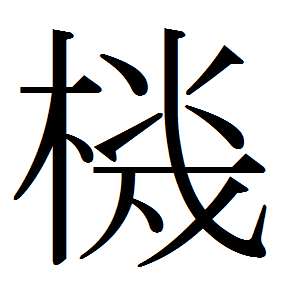

== See also ==
- 〆, shime, simplification of 占 (as 占め しめ shime)
- ヶ, small ke, simplification of 箇
- Kana ligature
- Shinjitai
- Simplified Chinese character
- Variant Chinese character
- Yakja, Korean simplifications
