= " (disambiguation) =

The symbol " is a Quotation mark (a punctuation mark used in pairs in various writing systems to set off direct speech, a quotation, or a phrase).

The mark " also resembles other characters, and is sometimes substituted for them:

- Double prime (″), used for:
  - Inch, a unit of length in the US customary and the obsolete (British) Imperial systems of measurement
  - Arcsecond, a fraction of an arcminute
- Ditto mark (〃), a typographic symbol indicating that the word(s) or figure(s) above it are to be repeated
- Gershayim (״), a typographical mark in the Hebrew language
- Modifier letter double apostrophe (ˮ), a modifier letter used in the Tundra Nenets and Dan languages

== See also ==
- '' (disambiguation)
