= '' =

'' (two apostrophes) may refer to:

- An empty string
- A quotation mark (")
- A ditto mark
- A double acute accent (◌̋)
- A double grave accent (◌̏)
- An umlaut diacritic (◌̈)
- A diaeresis diacritic (◌̈)
- Italic markup in MediaWiki

== See also ==
- " (disambiguation)
