= Small ke =

Small form of the Japanese character ke

The small ke (ヶ) is a Japanese character, typographically a small form of the katakana character ケ ke.

While identical in shape to a small ケ (which is originally from 介), and sometimes written as a large character, ヶ is actually an abbreviation for the kanji 箇, specifically by writing half of the bamboo radical 竹 (⺮). 箇, alternatively written as 個 (or 个), is a common Japanese counter word. ヶ is also as an abbreviation for the Japanese conjunctive particle が. It is pronounced ka (sometimes ko) when it specifies a counter, or ga when it specifies a conjunction, but not ke.

However, ヶ is not used as a general abbreviation for 箇 or 個. For example, 個人 kojin "individual" will not be written as ^{×}ヶ人 (except possibly as very informal ryakuji; contrast with 〆, as an abbreviation for 締). Note that 個 is used in various words, but 箇 is generally only used as a counter, or as a variant of 個.

When used as a counter, the katakana カ or ヵ are sometimes used instead. When used as a counter but pronounced ko, the katakana コ is sometimes used instead (chiefly in informal writing). The most familiar example as a counter is for counting months, as in 1ヶ月 (ik-ka-getsu, one month [duration]) where it is pronounced ka. Other common examples are places 〜ヶ所 (-ka-sho) and countries 〜ヶ国 (-ka-koku). An example where it is pronounced as ko is when counting small objects, such as pieces of fruit or candy, where one may write 一ヶ (ik-ko), rather than the more formal 一個; this is particularly common in hand-written signs at shops, though 一コ is also common.

When used as the conjunction 〜が〜 (-ga-), it has the same meaning as 〜の〜 (-no-) which is more common in modern Japanese and is commonly used in place names, though rare in everyday words. One relatively common word using ヶ is 雁ヶ音 karigane (kari-ga-ne, goose-'s-sound, 'the cry of the wild goose').

In place names, ヶ is generally a conjunction, and hence pronounced ga, particularly as 「〜ヶ原」 (-ga-hara) "field of ...", as in 青木ヶ原 (Aokigahara, field of green trees). It may also be a counter, where it will generally be pronounced ka, as in 三ヶ日 (Mikkabi, place name, "three days"). In some cases both ヶ and が (and even ケ) are used to write a place name, depending on the specific place with a given name or usage. This may have also changed over time, so older documents may use a different form, and older institutions may use an outdated spelling. The most conspicuous example is Jiyūgaoka, which refers to a number of places throughout Japan (see 自由ヶ丘), some of which officially use 自由が丘, 自由ヶ丘, or 自由ケ丘. The best-known of these is a popular neighborhood in Tokyo, whose official form is 自由が丘, but it was formerly 自由ヶ丘, changing in 1965 (the station changed in 1966), and some businesses use the older form.

The hiragana version of the character exists in Unicode as ゖ, but it is virtually unused.
