= Onpu =

Onpu or ONPU may refer to:

- Odesa National Polytechnic University, a university in Odesa, Ukraine
- Japanese term for the phonetic component of a kanji character (Chinese character)
- Japanese for musical note, often used for characters such as ♪ (see List of Japanese typographic symbols#Other special marks)
- Onpu Segawa, a.k.a. Ellie Craft, a main character in Ojamajo Doremi
