= Pinkus Frankl =

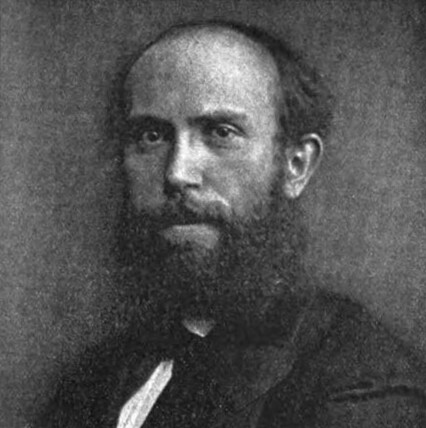
- Frankl in 1907.

Personal life
- Born: February 28, 1848 Ungarisch-Brod, Moravia
- Died: August 22, 1887 (aged 39) Johannisbad, Bohemia

Religious life
- Religion: Judaism

Pinkus Friedrich Frankl (Hebrew: פנחס פראנקל; February 28, 1848 – August 22, 1887) was a German rabbi and scholar.

== Biography ==
Title page of Aḥar reshef le-vaḳer

Pinkus Friedrich Frankl was born in Ungarisch-Brod, Moravia, in 1848. He received his education at the yeshivah in Pressburg, and later prepared for the rabbinate at the Jewish Theological Seminary in Breslau. Simultaneously, he pursued studies in Orientalia at the university of the same city, earning his doctoral degree in 1870.

In 1875, Frankl assumed the position of secretary of the Wiener Israelitische Allianz. In 1877, he succeeded Abraham Geiger as rabbi in Berlin. Frankl's responsibilities expanded in 1881 when he also took on a teaching role at the Lehranstalt für die Wissenschaft des Judenthums, lecturing in Jewish philosophy, medieval Hebrew literature, and homiletics. During this period, he collaborated with Heinrich Graetz on the publication of the Monatsschrift für die Geschichte und Wissenschaft des Judenthums.

== Selected publications ==
- Ein Mutazilitischer Kalâm aus dem 10. Jahrhundert. Vienna: K. Gerold's Sohn. 1872.
- Studien über die Septuaginta und Peschito zu Jeremia. 1872.
- Karäische Studien. Krotoschin: B. L. Monasch & Co. 1876.
- Beiträge zur Literaturgeschichte der Karäer. Berlin. 1887.
- Fest und Gesegenheits-Predigten. Berlin: L. Simion. 1888.
- Zunz, Leopold (1884). "Piyyuṭe ben Ḳalir". Jubelschrift zum 90. Geburtstag des Dr. Leopold Zunz. Berlin. pp. 201–207. ISBN 9783487404776. Piyyuṭim of Eleazar ha-Ḳalir.
- Aḥar reshef le-vaḳer. Vienna: G. Brög & P. Smolenskin. 1886. A criticism of Simḥah Pinsker's Liḳuṭe Ḳadmoniyot, first published in Ha-Shaḥar (1876–1877).
