= Monatsschrift für die Geschichte und Wissenschaft des Judenthums =

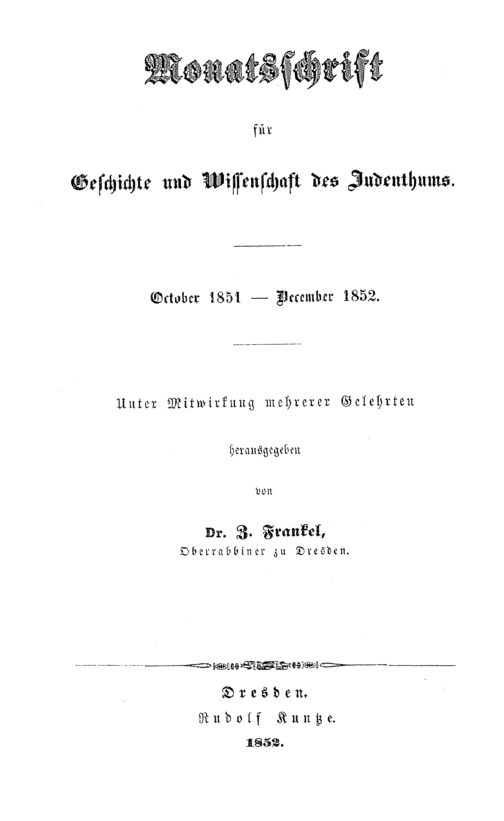
- Monthly magazine for the History and Science of Judaism 1851/52.
- Categories: Jewish history, Judaism
- Frequency: Monthly
- Founder: Zecharias Frankel
- Founded: 1851
- First issue: October 1851
- Final issue Number: 1939; 83
- Country: Germany
- Language: German
- OCLC: 5764327

Monatsschrift für die Geschichte und Wissenschaft des Judenthums ("Monthly magazine for the history and science of Judaism", abbreviated to MGWJ) was a monthly journal devoted to the Science of Judaism. It was founded by Zecharias Frankel in Dresden in 1851, following the suppression of Zeitschrift für die Religiösen Interessen des Judenthums in 1846. It was published in Germany for 83 years between 1851 and 1939 (except in 1887–1892) In time, it became the leading journal in the Jewish academic world.

It was founded to serve as the organ of what Frankel called the "positive-historical school" in Jewish life and scholarship, which took up a middle position between Reform as represented by Abraham Geiger, and Orthodoxy as interpreted by Samson Raphael Hirsch and Azriel Hildesheimer. This type of Judaism, conservative in its approach to Jewish observance and ritual but undogmatic in matters of scholarship and research, was taught at the Jewish Theological Seminary at Breslau, founded in 1854 with Frankel as head; the Monatsschrift was intimately though not formally connected with this Seminary and drew its editors and contributors mainly from the ranks of its lecturers and alumni.

Frankel remained the editor of the Monatsschrift until 1868; the first seventeen volumes of the publication were edited by Frankel. Starting in 1869 he was succeeded in the task by the historian Heinrich Graetz. The latter edited vols. xviii. to xxxvi. inclusive, being assisted by Pinkus Frankl of the Berlin Hochschule für die Wissenschaft des Judentums in vols. xxxiii. to xxxv. Publication was stopped in 1887, when Graetz reached the age of 70 years old. It was resumed in 1892, with Marcus Brann and David Kaufmann as joint editors (vols. xxxvii. to xliii.). Upon Kaufmann's death (1899) Brann became sole editor. Since Jan., 1904, the Monatsschrift has appeared as the organ of the Gesellschaft zur Förderung der Wissenschaft des Judentums.

The "Monatsschrift" was first published in Dresden. Some volumes were then issued in Krotoschin and some in Berlin; but the greatest number appeared in Breslau. A complete table of contents for the first seventeen volumes is appended to vol. xvii., and a similar table for the years 1869 to 1887 is given at the end of vol. xxxvi. This table has been published separately also.
