= Niigata =

Niigata (新潟; "New Lagoon") may refer to:

- Niigata Prefecture, Japan
  - Niigata (city), the capital of the prefecture
- Albirex Niigata, professional football club
- Niigata Transys, a Japanese railway vehicle manufacturer
