= Suzhou numerals =

Numeral system formerly used in China

- Traditional Chinese: 蘇州碼子
- Simplified Chinese: 苏州码子
Transcriptions
Standard Mandarin
- Hanyu Pinyin: sūzhōu mǎzi
Wu
- Suzhounese: sou1-tseu1 mo6-tsy3
Yue: Cantonese
- Jyutping: sou1 zau1 maa5 zi2

Alternative Chinese name
- Traditional Chinese: 花碼
- Simplified Chinese: 花码
- Literal meaning: flowery or fancy numbers
Transcriptions
Standard Mandarin
- Hanyu Pinyin: huāmǎ
Wu
- Suzhounese: hua1 mo6
Yue: Cantonese
- Jyutping: faa1 maa5

The Suzhou numerals, also known as Sūzhōu mǎzi (蘇州碼子), is a numeral system used in China before the introduction of Hindu-Arabic numerals. The Suzhou numerals are also known as Soochow numerals, ma‑tzu, huāmǎ (花碼), cǎomǎ (草碼), jīngzǐmǎ (菁仔碼), fānzǐmǎ (番仔碼) and shāngmǎ (商碼).

== History ==
The Suzhou numerals for 5 and 9 come from their respective horizontal forms of the rod numerals, combining a vertical rod for 5 and a circle for 0 or a cross for 4 respectively. Note that circles are written clockwise traditionally in China.

The Suzhou numeral system is the only surviving variation of the rod numeral system. The rod numeral system is a positional numeral system used by the Chinese in mathematics. Suzhou numerals are a variation of the Southern Song rod numerals.

Suzhou numerals were used as shorthand in number-intensive areas of commerce such as accounting and bookkeeping. At the same time, standard Chinese numerals were used in formal writing, akin to spelling out the numbers in English. Suzhou numerals were once popular in Chinese marketplaces, such as those in Hong Kong and Chinese restaurants in Malaysia before the 1990s, but they have gradually been supplanted by Hindu numerals. This is similar to what had happened in Europe with Roman numerals used in ancient and medieval Europe for mathematics and commerce. Nowadays, the Suzhou numeral system is only used for displaying prices in Chinese markets or on traditional handwritten invoices.

== Symbols ==
In the Suzhou numeral system, special symbols are used for digits instead of the Chinese characters. The digits of the Suzhou numerals are defined between U+3021 and U+3029 in Unicode. An additional three code points starting from U+3038 were added later.

Unicode for Suzhou numerals
Number	"Suzhou"		CJK ideographs	
Number	Character	Unicode	Character	Unicode
0	〇	U+3007	零	U+96F6
1	〡	U+3021	一	U+4E00
2	〢	U+3022	二	U+4E8C
3	〣	U+3023	三	U+4E09
4	〤	U+3024	四	U+56DB
5	〥	U+3025	五	U+4E94
6	〦	U+3026	六	U+516D
7	〧	U+3027	七	U+4E03
8	〨	U+3028	八	U+516B
9	〩	U+3029	九	U+4E5D
10	〸	U+3038	十	U+5341
20	〹	U+3039	廿	U+5EFF
30	〺	U+303A	卅	U+5345

The symbols for 5 to 9 are derived from those for 0 to 4 by adding a vertical bar on top, which is similar to adding an upper bead which represents a value of 5 in an abacus. The resemblance makes the Suzhou numerals intuitive to use together with the abacus as the traditional calculation tool.

The numbers one, two, and three are all represented by vertical bars. This can cause confusion when they appear next to each other. Standard Chinese ideographs are often used in this situation to avoid ambiguity. For example, "21" is written as "〢一" instead of "〢〡" which can be confused with "3" (〣). The first character of such sequences is usually represented by the Suzhou numeral, while the second character is represented by the Chinese ideograph.

== Notations ==
The digits are positional. The full numerical notations are written in two lines to indicate numerical value, order of magnitude, and unit of measurement. Following the rod numeral system, the digits of the Suzhou numerals are always written horizontally from left to right, just like how numbers are represented in an abacus, even when used within vertically written documents.

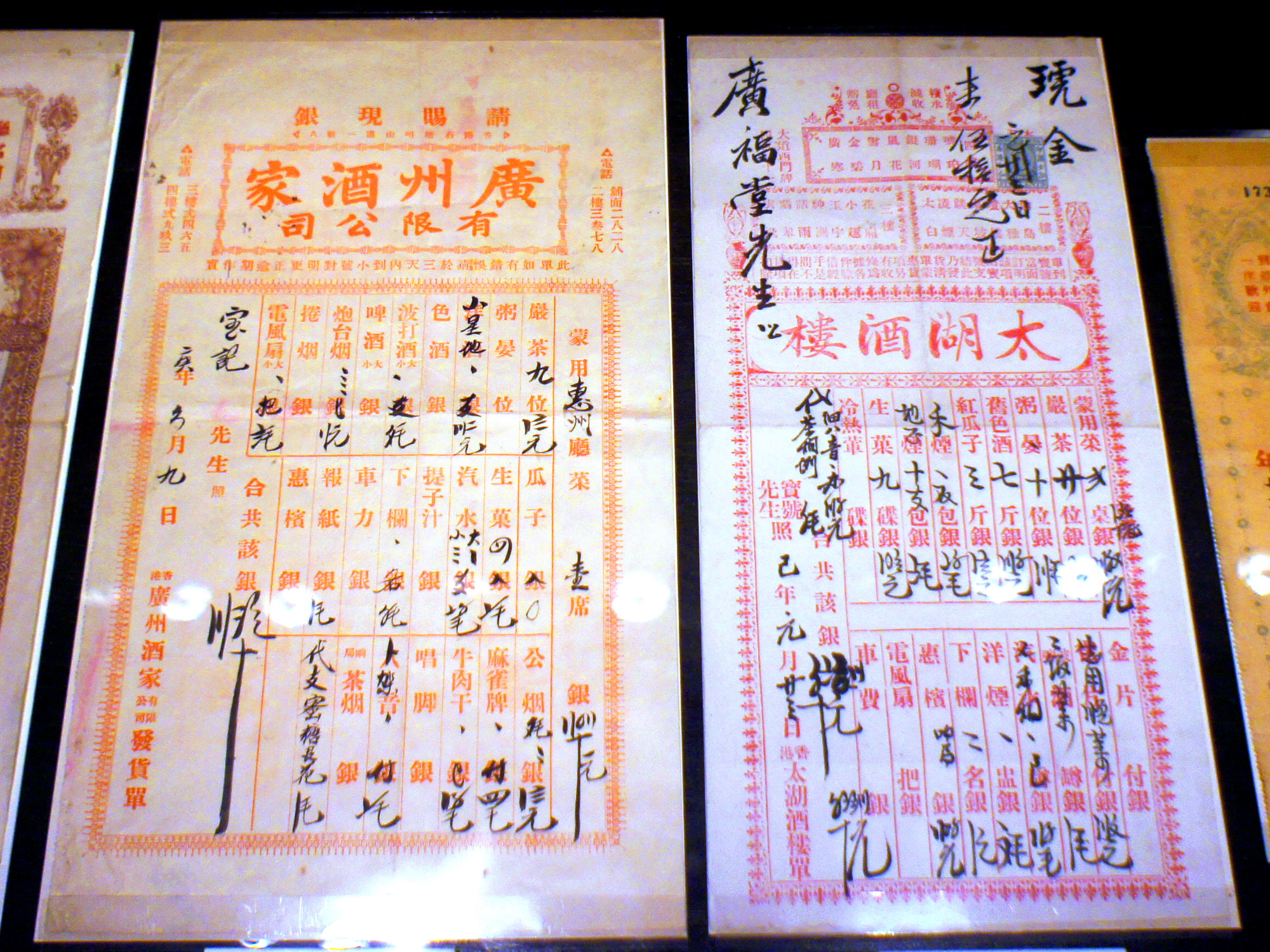
Suzhou numerals on banquet invoices issued by restaurants circa 1910–1920s. Although the invoices use traditional right-to-left vertical writing, the Suzhou numerals recording the amounts are written horizontally from left to right.

For example:

〤	〇	〢	二
十	元

The first line contains the numerical values, in this example, "〤〇〢二" stands for "4022". The second line consists of Chinese characters that represents the order of magnitude and unit of measurement of the first digit in the numerical representation. In this case "十元" which stands for "ten yuan". When put together, it is then read as "40.22 yuan".

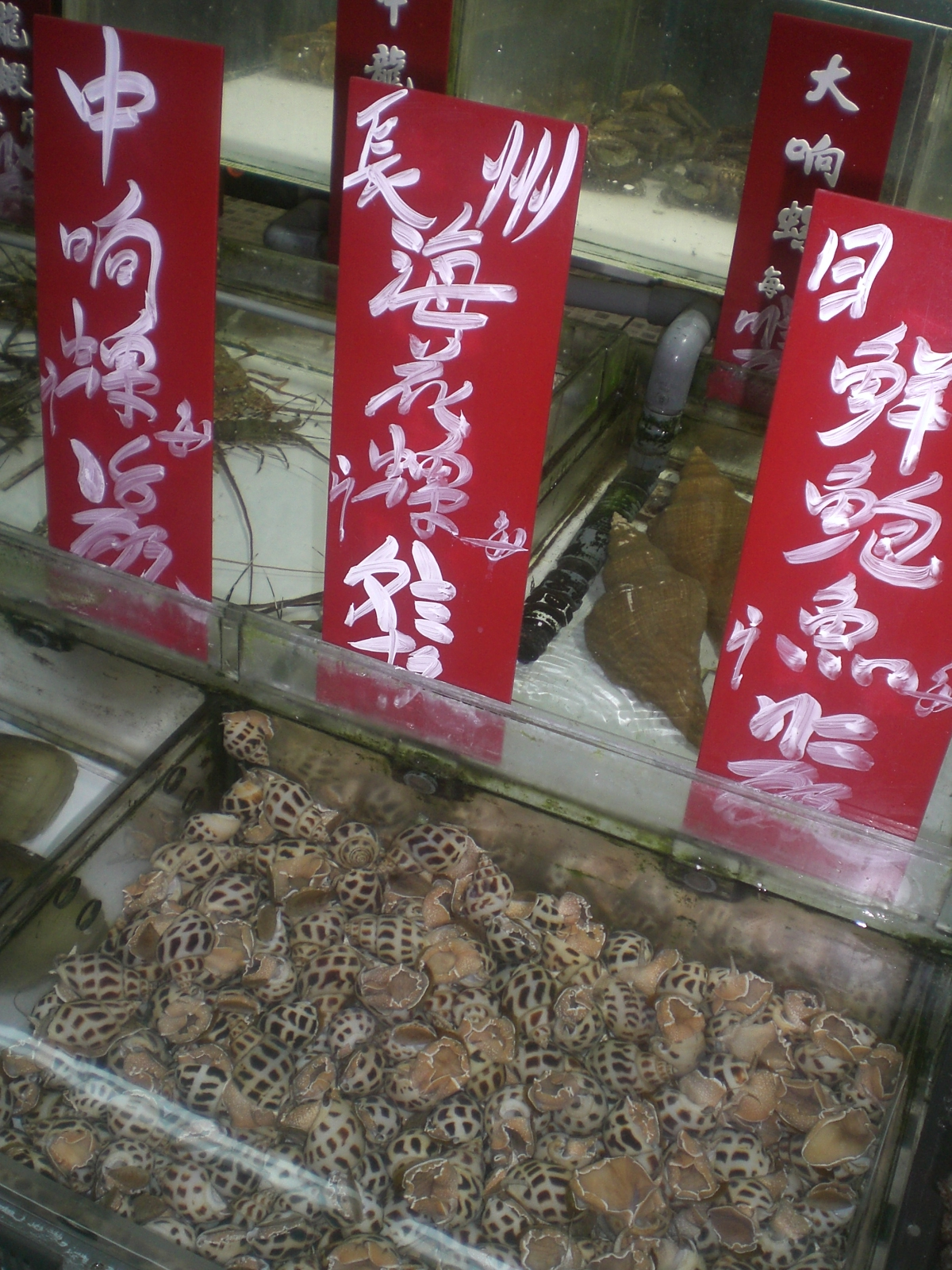
Suzhou numerals on a market in Wan Chai

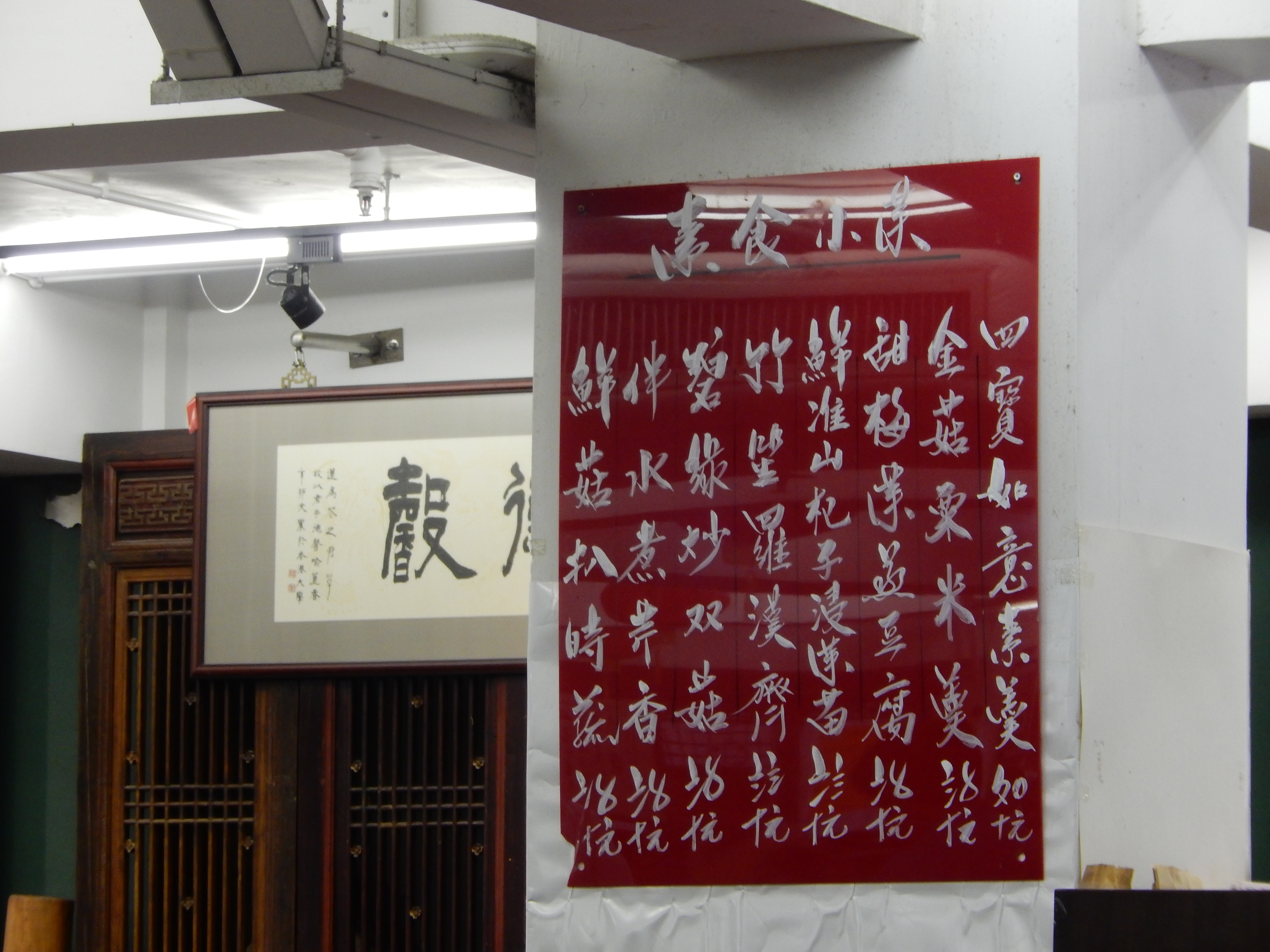
A menu with prices in Suzhou numerals in a Hong Kong restaurant

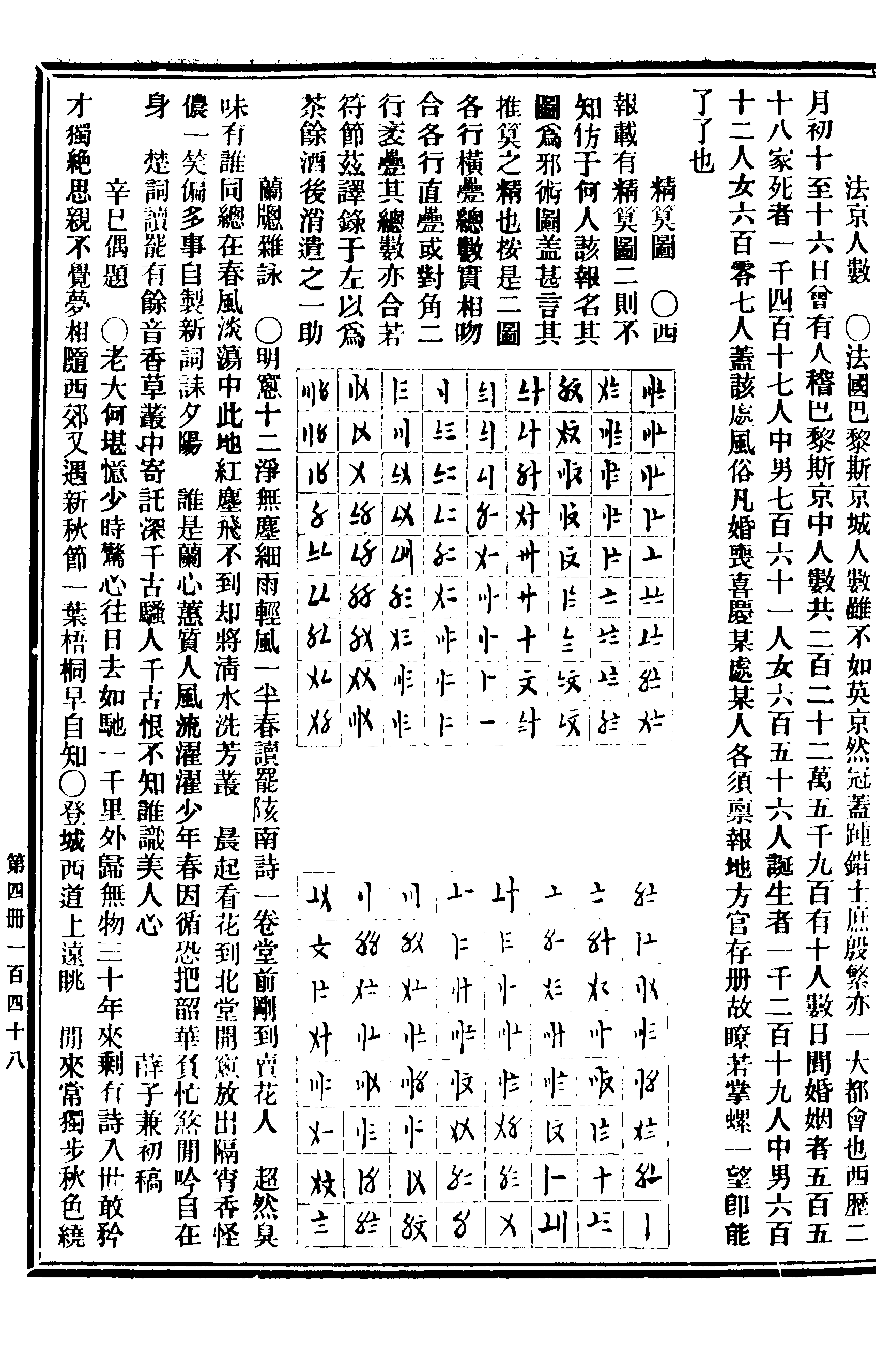
Two magic squares in Suzhou numerals in a 19th-century Chinese Catholic journal

Possible characters denoting order of magnitude include:

- wàn (万) for myriads (As a variant of the traditional character 萬, it is used for speed of writing in Suzhou numerals even before simplification of Chinese characters.)
- qiān (千) for thousands
- bǎi (百) for hundreds
- shí (十) for tens
- blank for ones

Other possible characters denoting unit of measurement include:

- yuán (元) for dollar
- máo (毫 or 毛) for 10 cents
- lǐ (里) for the Chinese mile
- any other Chinese measurement unit

Notice that the decimal point is implicit when the first digit is set at the ten position. Zero is represented by the character for zero (〇). Leading and trailing zeros are unnecessary in this system.

This is very similar to the modern scientific notation for floating point numbers where the significant digits are represented in the mantissa and the order of magnitude is specified in the exponent. Also, the unit of measurement, with the first digit indicator, is usually aligned to the middle of the "numbers" row.

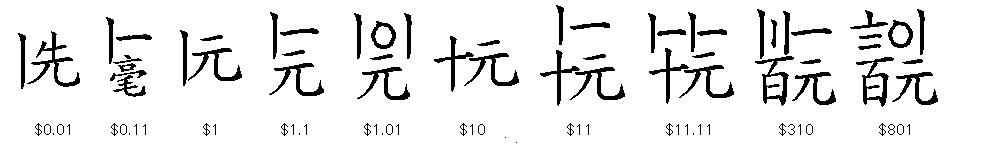
Several examples of the pricing values present in Suzhou numerals.

== Hangzhou misnomer ==
In the Unicode standard version 3.0, these characters are incorrectly named Hangzhou style numerals. In the Unicode standard 4.0, an erratum was added which stated:

The Suzhou numerals (Chinese su1zhou1ma3zi) are special numeric forms used by traders to display the prices of goods. The use of "HANGZHOU" in the names is a misnomer.

All references to "Hangzhou" in the Unicode standard have been corrected to "Suzhou" except for the character names themselves, which cannot be changed once assigned, in accordance with the Unicode Stability Policy. (This policy allows software to use the names as unique identifiers.)

== See also ==
- Unicode numerals
