= List of Japanese typographic symbols =

This article lists Japanese typographic symbols that are not included in kana or kanji groupings.

== Repetition marks ==
	JIS X 0208	JIS X 0213	Unicode	Name(s)	Usage
々	2139	1-1-25	3005	noma (ノマ) kuma (クマ) kurikaeshi (繰り返し) dō no jiten (同の字点)	Kanji iteration mark. For example, 様様 could be written 様々. From 仝 (below).
仝	2138	1-1-24	4EDD	dō no jiten (同の字点)	Kanji repetition mark
ヽ	2152	1-1-19	30FD	katakanagaeshi (かたかながえし) kurikaeshi (くりかえし)	Katakana iteration mark
ヾ	2153	1-1-20	30FE	katakanagaeshi (かたかながえし) kurikaeshi (くりかえし)	Katakana iteration mark with a dakuten (voiced consonant)
ゝ	2154	1-1-21	309D	hiraganagaeshi (ひらがながえし) kurikaeshi (くりかえし)	Hiragana iteration mark. For example, はは (haha) could be written はゝ.
ゞ	2136	1-1-22	309E	hiraganagaeshi (ひらがながえし) kurikaeshi (くりかえし)	Hiragana iteration mark with a dakuten (voiced consonant). For example, はば (haba) could be written はゞ.
〃	2137	1-1-23	3003	nonoten (ノノ点)	Ditto mark. The name originates from resemblance to two katakana no characters (ノノ).
〱			3031		Kana vertical repetition mark
〲			3032		Kana vertical repetition mark with a dakuten
〳 〵		1-2-19 (top), 1-2-21 (bottom)	3033 (top), 3035 (bottom)	kunojiten (くの字点)	Repetition mark used in vertical writing. It means repeat the previous two or more kana.
〴 〵		1-2-20 (top), 1-2-21 (bottom)	3034 (top), 3035 (bottom)	kunojiten (くの字点)	Kunojiten with a dakuten

== Brackets and quotation marks ==
	JIS X 0208	JIS X 0213	Unicode	Name(s)	Usage
「」	2156, 2157	1–1–54, 1-1-55	300C, 300D	kagi (鉤, "hook") kagikakko (鉤括弧, "hook brackets")	Usual Japanese quotation marks
『』	2158, 2159	1–1–56, 1-1-57	300E, 300F	kagi (鉤) nijūkagikakko (二重鉤括弧, "double hook brackets")	Japanese version of double quotes, often used when indicating titles
（）	2169, 216A	1–1–42, 1-1-43	FF08, FF09	pāren (パーレン, "parentheses") kakko (括弧) marugakko (丸括弧, "round brackets") shōkakko (小括弧, "small brackets")	
〔〕	216C, 216E	1–1–44, 1-1-45	3014, 3015	kikkō (亀甲, "tortoise shell")	Used to insert comments into quoted text
［］	216D, 216E	1–1–46, 1-1-47	FF3B, FF3D	kakko (括弧) kagikakko (鉤括弧)	
｛｝	216F, 2170	1–1–48, 1-1-49	FF5B, FF5D	brace (ブレース, "brace") namikakko (波括弧, "wave brackets") chūkakko (中括弧, "middle brackets")	
｟｠			FF5E, FF60	nijūpāren (二重パーレン, "double parentheses") nijūkakko (二重括弧, "double brackets")	
〈〉	2171, 2172	1–1–50, 1-1-51	3008, 3009	kakko (括弧) yamagakko (山括弧, "hill brackets") gyume (ギュメ, "guillemets") yamagata (山がた, "hill-shaped [symbol]")	The name gyume is phonetically guillemets
《》	2173, 2174	1–1–52, 1-1-53	300A, 300B	kakko (括弧) nijūyamagakko (二重山括弧, "double hill brackets") nijū-gyume (二重ギュメ, "double guillemets") nijūyamagata (二重山がた, "double hill-shaped [symbol]")	
【】	2179, 217A	1–1–58, 1-1-59	3010, 3011	kakko (括弧) sumitsukikakko (隅付き括弧)	Used in headings, for example in dictionary definitions Referred to as Lenticular brackets in English.
〖〗		1–2–58, 1-2-59	3016, 3017		
〘〙		1–2–56, 1-2-57	3018, 3019		
〚〛			301A, 301B		

== Phonetic marks ==
	JIS X 0208	JIS X 0213	Unicode	Name(s)	Usage
っ	2443	1-4-35	3063	sokuon (促音, "double consonant")	Doubles the sound of the next consonant. For example, "かた" /kata/ becomes "かった" /katta/, and "ショク" /shoku/ becomes "ショック" /shokku/
ッ		1-5-35	30C4	sokuon (促音, "double consonant")	Doubles the sound of the next consonant. For example, "かた" /kata/ becomes "かった" /katta/, and "ショク" /shoku/ becomes "ショック" /shokku/
ー	213C	1-1-28	30FC	chōonpu (長音符, "long sound symbol") onbiki (音引き) bōbiki (棒引き) bōsen (棒線, "bar line")	Indicates a lengthened vowel sound. Often used with katakana. The direction of writing depends on the direction of text.
゛	212B	1-1-11	309B (standalone), 3099 (combining)	dakuten (濁点, "voiced point") nigori (濁り, "voiced") ten-ten (点々, "dots")	Used with both hiragana and katakana to indicate a voiced sound. For example, ta (た) becomes da (だ), shi (し) becomes ji (じ).
゜	212C	1-1-12	309C (standalone), 309A (combining)	handakuten (半濁点, "half-voice point") handaku (半濁, "half-voiced") maru (丸, "circle")	Used with hiragana and katakana to indicate a change from a hahifuheho sound to a papipupepo sound.

== Punctuation marks ==
	JIS X 0208	JIS X 0213	Unicode	Name(s)	Usage
。	2123	1-1-3	3002	kuten (句点, "sentence point", "period") maru (丸, "circle", "small ball")	Marks the end of a sentence. Japanese equivalent of full stop or period.
、	2122	1-1-4	3001	tōten (読点, "reading point")	Japanese equivalent of a comma
・	2126	1-1-6	30FB	nakaguro (中黒, "middle black") potsu (ぽつ) nakaten (中点, "middle point")	Used to separate foreign words and items in lists. For example, if ビルゲイツ ("BillGates") is written instead of ビル・ゲイツ ("Bill Gates"), a Japanese speaker unfamiliar with the name might have difficulty working out where the boundary between the given name and surname lies. Also used in some dictionaries to separate furigana and okurigana when noting kanji readings. For example, the reading for 上 in the term 上がる (a-garu, "to ascend") may be given as あ・がる, indicating that it is read as あ (a) when followed by the suffix がる (-garu). This symbol is known as an interpunct in English.
゠ ＝			30A0, FF1D	daburu haifun (ダブルハイフン, "double hyphen")	Sometimes replaces an English en dash or hyphen when writing foreign words in katakana. It is also rarely used to separate given and family names, though the middle dot (nakaguro) is much more common in these cases. See also double hyphen.

== Other special marks ==
	JIS X 0208	JIS X 0213	Unicode	Name(s)	Usage
〆	213A	1-1-26	3006	shime (しめ)	This character is used to write 締め shime in 締め切り／締切 shimekiri ("deadline") (as 〆切) and similar things. It is also used, less commonly, for other shime namely 閉め, 絞め and 占め. A variant 乄 is used as well, to indicate that a letter is closed, as abbreviation of 閉め. The character originated as a cursive form of ト, the top component of 占 (as in 占める shimeru), and was then applied to other kanji of the same pronunciation. See ryakuji for similar abbreviations. This character is also commonly used in regards to sushi. In this context, it refers that the sushi is pickled, and it is still pronounced shime.
〜	2141	1-1-33	301C	nyoro (にょろ) naishi (ないし) nami (波, "wave") kara (から)	Used in "to from" constructions in Japanese, such as 月〜金曜日 "from Monday to Friday". In horizontal writing and on computers, the fullwidth tilde ～ (FF5E) is often used instead.
…	2144	1-1-36	2026	tensen (点線, "dot line") santen leader (三点リーダ, "three-dot leader")	A line of dots corresponding to one half of a Japanese ellipsis also used as an ellipsis informally
‥	2145	1-1-37	2025	tensen (点線, "dot line") niten leader (二点リーダ, "two-dot leader")	Rarely used
• ◦ ﹅ ﹆		1-3-32, 1-3-31 - -	2022, 25E6, FE45, FE46	bōten (傍点, "side dot") wakiten (脇点, "side dot") kurogoma (黒ゴマ, "sesame dot") shirogoma (白ゴマ, "white sesame dot")	Adding these dots to the sides of characters (right side in vertical writing, above in horizontal writing) emphasizes the character in question. It is the Japanese equivalent of the use of italics for emphasis in English.
※	2228	1-2-8	203B	kome (米, "rice") komejirushi (米印, "rice symbol")	This symbol is used in notes (註, chū) as a reference mark, similar to an asterisk
＊	2196	1-1-86	FF0A	hoshijirushi (星印, "star symbol") asterisk (アステリスク, "asterisk")	This symbol is used in notes (註, chū)
〽		1-3-28	303D	ioriten (庵点)	This mark is used to show the start of a singer's part in a song
〓	222E	1-2-14	3013	geta kigō (ゲタ記号, "geta symbol")	Used as a proofreader's mark indicating unavailability of a glyph, such as when a character cannot be displayed on a computer. The name comes from geta, a type of Japanese sandal.
♪ ♫ ♬ ♩	2276	1-2-86, 1-2-91, 1-2-92, 1-2-93	266A, 266B, 266C, 2669	onpu (音符, "musical note")	Often used as an emoticon in informal text to indicate a singsong tone of voice or a playful attitude
〇			3007	maru (まる, "circle")	Two circles (marumaru) are often used as a placeholder (either because a number of other words or numbers could be used in that position, or because of censorship)

== Organization-specific symbols ==
	JIS X 0208	JIS X 0213	Unicode	Name(s)	Usage
〒	2229	1-2-9	3012	yūbin (郵便)	Used to indicate post offices on maps, and printed before postcodes. See also Japanese addressing system and Japan Post.
〶			3036		Variant postal mark in a circle
〠		1-6-70	3020		Variant postal mark with a face
〄			3004	(jis mark (ジスマーク, "JIS mark") nihon kougyou kikaku (日本工業規格, "Japanese Industrial Standards", "JIS")	This mark on a product shows that it complies with the Japanese Industrial Standards
Ⓧ			24CD		This mark is used by the Recording Industry Association of Japan (RIAJ) on music publications to indicate that rental is prohibited. Depending on the format (single or album), and whether the content is of Japanese or foreign origin, the rental ban can last from three days up to one year after the release date, at the record company's discretion. Sometimes it is printed as just an uncircled "X", optionally followed by a swung dash ("~") and what may be the last date of the prohibition period. However, if the circled X only appears next to a release date (as indicated by "Y" or "L", see below), then it is unclear whether the release date is also the rental ban expiration date or if a standard prohibition period is in effect.
Ⓛ			24C1		This mark is used by the RIAJ on music publications to indicate that the content is of Japanese origin. It normally accompanies the release date, which may include a letter "N" "I" "H" "O" "R" "E" or "C" to represent a year from 1984 through 1990, such as "H·2·21" to represent 21 February 1986.
Ⓨ			24CE		This mark is used by the RIAJ on music publications to indicate that the content is of foreign origin. It normally accompanies the release date, which may include a letter "N" "I" "H" "O" "R" "E" or "C" to represent a year from 1984 through 1990, and may include a second date in parentheses, representing the first release date of the content globally.

== See also ==
- Japanese map symbols
- Japanese punctuation
- Emoji, which originated in Japanese mobile phone culture
