= Iteration mark =

Character or punctuation mark used to represent a duplicated character or word

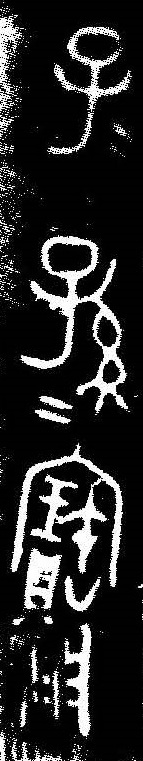
Bronzeware script, c. 825 BC

Iteration marks are characters or punctuation marks that represent a duplicated character or word.

== Chinese ==
In Chinese, a smaller version of the character 二 (meaning "two"), as 𖿣 (U+16FE3 𖿣 OLD CHINESE ITERATION MARK), is used in casual writing to represent a doubled character, alongside 〻 and 々. However, it is not used in formal writing anymore, and it rarely appeared in printed matter. In a tabulated table or list, vertical repetition can be represented by a ditto mark (〃).

=== History ===
Iteration marks have been occasionally used for more than two thousand years in China. The example image shows an inscription in bronze script, a variety of formal writing dating to the Zhou dynasty, that ends with "子_{二}孫_{二}寶用", where _{二} is used as iteration marks in the phrase "子子孫孫寶用" ("descendants to use and to treasure").

== Malayo-Polynesian languages ==
In Filipino, Indonesian, and Malay, words that are repeated can be shortened with the use of numeral "2". For example, the Malay kata-kata ("words", from single kata) can be shortened to kata2, and jalan-jalan ("to walk around", from single jalan) can be shortened to jalan2. The usage of "2" can be also replaced with superscript "^{2}" (e.g. kata^{2} for kata2). The sign may also be used for reduplicated compound words with slight sound changes, for example hingar^{2} for hingar-bingar ("commotion"). Suffixes may be added after "2", for example in the word kebarat^{2}an ("Western in nature", from the basic word barat ("West") with the prefix ke- and suffix -an).

The use of this mark dates back to the time when these languages were written with Arabic script, specifically the Jawi or Pegon varieties. Using the Arabic numeral ٢, words such as رام رام (rama-rama, butterfly) can be shortened to رام٢. The use of Arabic numeral ٢ was also adapted to several Brahmi derived scripts of the Malay archipelago, notably Javanese, Sundanese, Lontara, and Makassaran. As the Latin alphabet was introduced to the region, the Western-style Arabic numeral "2" came to be use for Latin-based orthography.

The use of "2" as an iteration mark was official in Indonesia up to 1972, as part of the Republican Spelling System. Its usage was discouraged when the Enhanced Indonesian Spelling System was adopted, and even though it is commonly found in handwriting, old signage or text messages, it is considered to be inappropriate for formal writing and documents.

== Japanese ==
Japanese has various iteration marks for its three writing systems, namely kanji, hiragana, and katakana, but only the kanji iteration mark (々) is commonly used today.

In Japanese, iteration marks called odoriji (踊り字, "dancing mark"), kasaneji (重ね字), kurikaeshikigō (繰り返し記号), or hanpukukigō (反復記号, "repetition symbols") are used to represent a duplicated character representing the same morpheme. For example, hitobito, "people", is usually written 人々, using the kanji for 人 with an iteration mark, 々, rather than 人人, using the same kanji twice. The use of two kanji in place of an iteration mark is allowed, and in simple cases may be used due to being easier to write.

In contrast, while hibi (日々, "daily, day after day") is written with the iteration mark, as the morpheme is duplicated, hinichi (日日, "number of days, date") is written with the character duplicated, because it represents different morphemes (hi and nichi). Further, while hibi can in principle be written as 日日, hinichi cannot be written as 日々, since that would imply repetition of the sound as well as the character. In potentially confusing examples such as this, readings can be disambiguated by writing words out in hiragana, so hinichi is often found as 日にち or ひにち rather than 日日.

Sound changes can occur in duplication, which is not reflected in writing; examples include hito (人) and hito (人) being pronounced hitobito (人々) (rendaku) or koku (刻) and koku (刻) being pronounced kokkoku (刻々) (gemination), though this is also pronounced kokukoku.

=== Kanji ===
〻, an iteration mark (derived from 𠄠) used only in vertical writing.

The formal name of the kanji repetition symbol (々) is dōnojiten (同の字点), literally "same character mark", but it is sometimes called noma (のま) because it looks like the katakana no (ノ) and ma (マ). This symbol originates from a simplified form of the character 仝, a variant of "same" (同) written in the cursive script style.

Although Japanese kanji iteration marks are borrowed from Chinese, the grammatical function of duplication differs, as do the conventions on the use of these characters.

While Japanese does not have a grammatical plural form per se, some kanji can be reduplicated to indicate plurality (as a collective noun, not many individuals). This differs from Chinese, which normally repeats characters only for the purposes of adding emphasis, although there are some exceptions (e.g., 人, rén, "person"; 人人, rénrén, "everybody").

- hito (人, person); hitobito (人々, people (not "persons"))
- yama (山, mountain); yamayama (山々, many mountains)

However, for some words duplication may alter the meaning:

- ko (個, piece, object); koko (個々, piece by piece; individually)
- toki (時, time); tokidoki (時々, sometimes)
- yokujitsu (翌日, next day); yokuyokujitsu (翌々日, lit. "next next day" (two days later))

Using 々 instead of repeating kanji is usually the preferred form, with two restrictions:

- the reading must be the same, possibly with sound change (as above), and
- the repetition must be within a single word.

When the reading is different, the second kanji is often simply written out to avoid confusion. Examples of such include:

- hinichi (日日 日にち)
- yutanpo (湯湯婆 湯たんぽ)
- dedashi (出出し 出だし)

The repetition mark is not used in every case where two identical characters appear side by side, but only where the repetition itself is etymologically significant—when the repetition is part of a single word. Where a character ends up appearing twice as part of a compound, it is usually written out in full:

- minshu-shugi (民主主義, "democracy"), from 民主 + 主義 ("democracy" + "principle"); the abbreviated 民主々義 is only occasionally seen. One notable exception is in signs for neighborhood associations (町内会, chōnaikai) – the name of neighborhoods often end in "... neighborhood" (〜町, -chō), which is then suffixed with 〜町内会 yielding "... neighborhood neighborhood association" (〜町町内会, -chō-chōnaikai), which is then informally abbreviated to 〜町々内会, despite the word break.

Similarly, in certain Chinese borrowings, it is generally preferred to write out both characters, as in 九九 (ku-ku Chinese multiplication table) or 担担麺 (tan-tan-men dan dan noodles), though in practice 々 is often used.

In vertical writing, the character 〻 (Unicode U+303B), a cursive derivative of 𠄠 ("two", as in Chinese, above), can be employed instead, although this is increasingly rare.

=== Kana ===
Kana uses different iteration marks; one for hiragana, ゝ, and one for katakana, ヽ. The hiragana iteration mark is seen in some personal names like さゝき Sasaki or おゝの Ōno, and it forms part of the formal name of the car company Isuzu (いすゞ).

Unlike the kanji iteration marks, which do not reflect sound changes, kana iteration marks closely reflect sound, and the kana iteration marks can be combined with the dakuten voicing mark to indicate that the repeated syllable should be voiced, for example みすゞ Misuzu. If the first syllable is already voiced, for example じじ jiji, the voiced repetition mark still needs to be used: じゞ rather than じゝ, which would be read as jishi.

While widespread in old Japanese texts, the kana iteration marks are generally not used in modern Japanese outside proper names, though they may appear in informal handwritten texts.

=== Repeating multiple characters ===
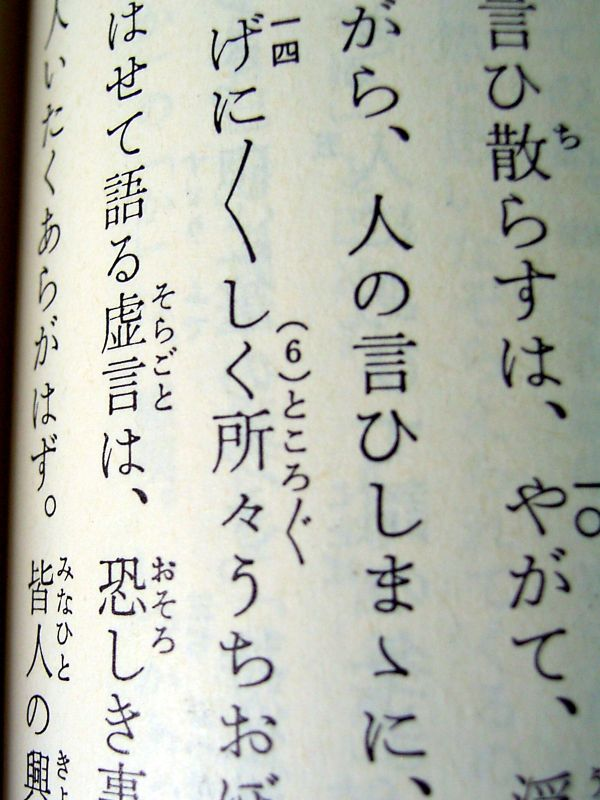
A variety of iteration marks in use in the classical text Tsurezuregusa (徒然草) 「世に語り傳ふる事–げにげにしく所々うちおぼめき–また疑ひ嘲るべからず」 (73rd passage)

In addition to the single-character iteration marks, there are also two-character-sized repeat marks, which are used to repeat the preceding word or phrase. They are used in vertical writing only, and they are effectively obsolete in modern Japanese. The vertical kana repeat marks 〱 (unvoiced) and 〲 (voiced) resemble the hiragana character ku (く), giving them their name, kunojiten (くの字点). They stretch to fill the space typically occupied by two characters, but may indicate a repetition of more than two characters. For example, the duplicated phrase 何とした何とした may be repeated as 何とした〱. If a dakuten (voiced mark) is added, it applies to the first sound of the repeated word; this is written as 〲. For example, tokorodokoro could be written horizontally as ところ〲; the voiced iteration mark only applies to the first sound と.

In addition to the single-character representations U+3031 〱 VERTICAL KANA REPEAT MARK and U+3032 〲 VERTICAL KANA REPEAT WITH VOICED SOUND MARK, Unicode provides the half-character versions U+3033 〳 VERTICAL KANA REPEAT MARK UPPER HALF, U+3034 〴 VERTICAL KANA REPEAT WITH VOICED SOUND MARK UPPER HALF and U+3035 〵 VERTICAL KANA REPEAT MARK LOWER HALF, which can be stacked to render both voiced and unvoiced repeat marks:

〳 〵	〴 〵

As support for these is limited, the ordinary forward slash ／ and backward slash ＼ are occasionally used as substitutes.

Alternatively, multiple single-character iteration marks can be used, as in tokorodokoro (ところゞゝゝ) or bakabakashii (馬鹿々々しい). This practice is also uncommon in modern writing, though it is occasionally seen in horizontal writing as a substitute for the vertical repeat mark.

Unlike the single-kana iteration mark, if the first kana is voiced, the unvoiced version 〱 alone will repeat the voiced sound.

Further, if okurigana are present, then no iteration mark should be used, as in 休み休み. This is prescribed by the Japanese Ministry of Education in its 1981 Cabinet notification prescribes, rule #6.

== Nuosu ==
In the Nuosu language, ꀕ is used to represent a doubled sound, for example ꈀꎭꀕ, kax sha sha. It is used in all forms of writing.

== Tangut ==
In Tangut manuscripts the sign 𖿠 is sometimes used to represent a doubled character; this sign does not occur in printed texts. In Unicode this character is U+16FE0 TANGUT ITERATION MARK, in the Ideographic Symbols and Punctuation block.

== Egyptian hieroglyphs ==
In Egyptian hieroglyphs, the signs:

zp Z1 Z1

— zp(wj) sn(wj), literally meaning "two times", repeat the previous sign or word.

== Khmer, Thai and Lao ==
Khmer leiktō (ៗ), Thai mai yamok (ๆ), and Lao ko la (ໆ) each represent a repeated syllable where as it besides the word. This used to be written as numeral two (២) and the form changed over time. A repeated word could be used either to demonstrate plurality, to emphasize, or to soften the meaning of the original word.

== Shorthand ==
Some shorthand systems use iteration marks to speed up or simplify writing.

=== Orthic ===
In the Orthic shorthand system, a dot placed below a letter indicates that it is doubled.

== Ditto mark ==
In English, Spanish, French, Italian, German, Portuguese, Czech, Polish and Turkish lists, the ditto mark (″) represents a word repeated from the equivalent position in the line above it; or an evenly-spaced row of ditto marks represents any number of words repeated from above. For example:

Two pounds of lettuce
Three "    "  tomatoes
Four  "    "  onions
One   "    "  carrots

This is common in handwriting and formerly in typewritten texts.

In Unicode, the ditto mark of Western languages has been defined to be equivalent to the U+2033 ″ DOUBLE PRIME (&Prime;). The separate character U+3003 〃 DITTO MARK is to be used in the CJK scripts only.

The convention in Polish handwriting, Czech, Swedish, and Austrian German is to use a ditto mark on the baseline together with horizontal lines spanning the extent of the word repeated, for example:

- Dwa kilogramy pomidorów
- Trzy — „ — cebuli
- Cztery — „ — ziemniaków

== Superscript numeral ==
In western mathematics, the superscript numeral originated as a notation for exponentiation. Over time, its meaning expanded to represent repeated function application as well, effectively making it a notation for marking iteration. This sense was eventually borrowed in non mathematical text to represent repeated symbols, especially to mark repeated letters in acronyms. The superscript is occasionally left out, either colloquially or in the formal representation of the acronym, due to either typographic or stylistic concerns. Notable examples include the bus protocol I^{2}C, the World Wide Web Consortium (W3C), and the fan-fiction hosting website AO3.

== See also ==
- Japanese typographic symbols
