= Ditto mark =

Typographic symbol indicating repetition of characters above

"o

Ditto mark
- In Unicode: U+0027 ' APOSTROPHE (×2); U+0022 " QUOTATION MARK

Related
- See also: U+2033 ″ DOUBLE PRIME; U+201D ” RIGHT DOUBLE QUOTATION MARK; U+3003 〃 DITTO MARK (CJK character)

The ditto mark is a shorthand sign, used mostly in hand-written text, indicating that the words or figures above it are to be repeated.

The mark is made using "a pair of apostrophes"; "a pair of marks " used underneath a word"; the symbol " (quotation mark); or the symbol ” (right double quotation mark). The abbreviation "do." was a common alternative notation.

In the following example, the second line reads "Blue pens, box of twenty".

Black pens, box of twenty ... $2.10
Blue  "     "   "  "      ... $2.35

== History ==
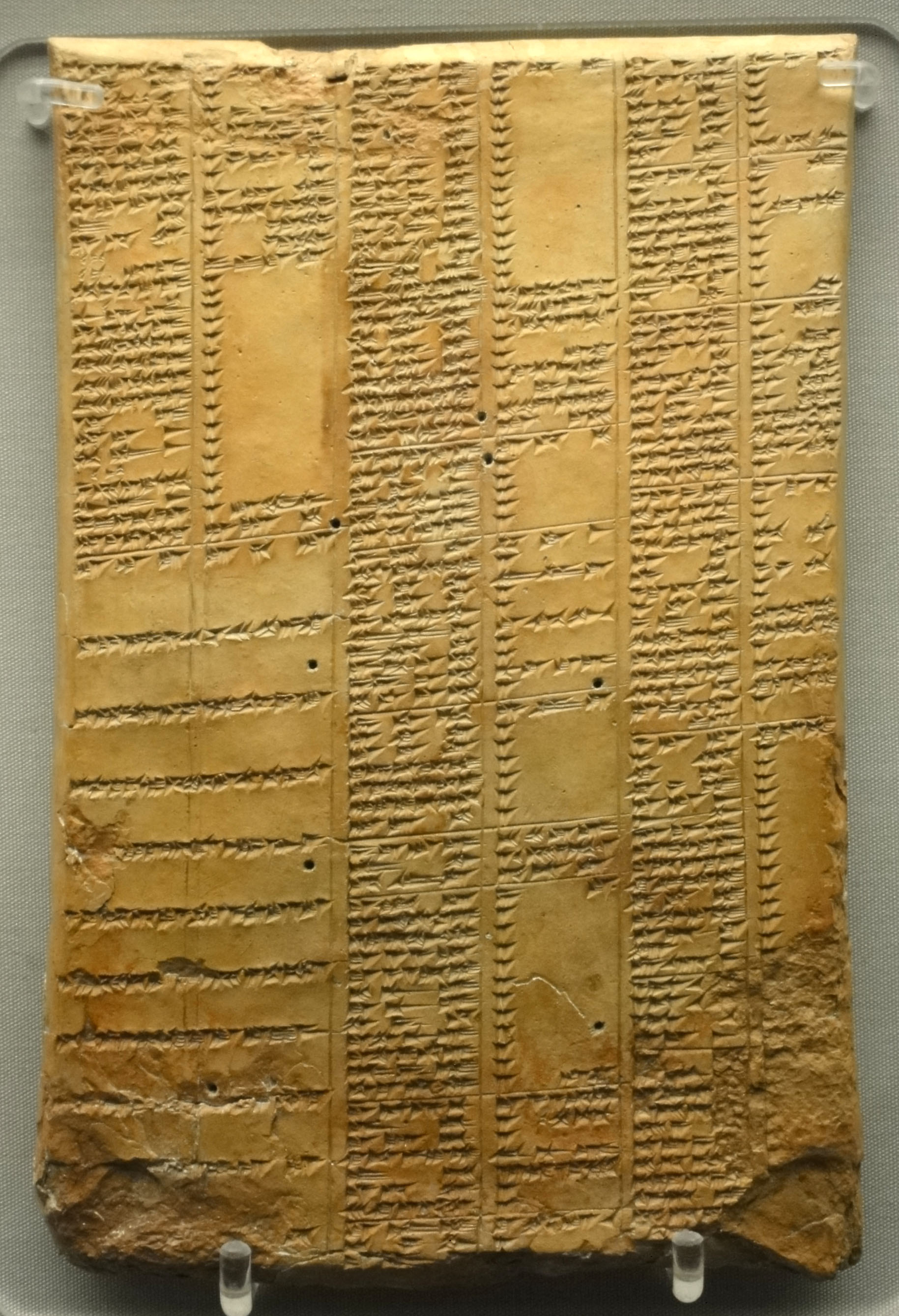
Ditto marks date to cuneiform tablets.

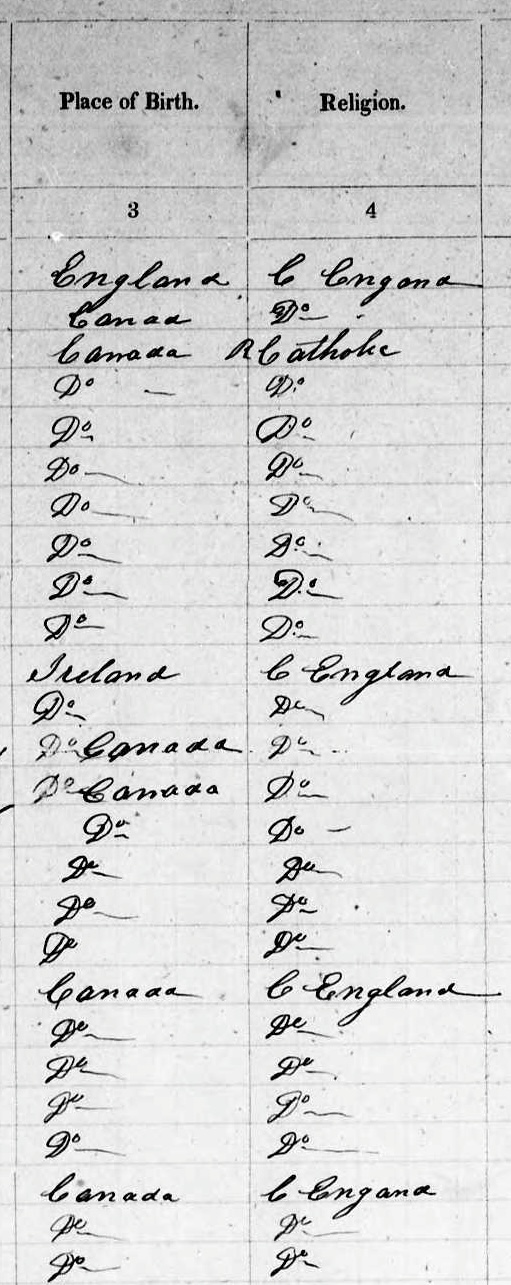
"Do." ditto marks in the 1951 Canadian census.

Early evidence of ditto marks can be seen on a cuneiform tablet of the Neo-Assyrian period (934–608 BCE) where two vertical marks are used in a table of synonyms to repeat text.

The word ditto comes from the Tuscan language, where it is the past participle of the verb dire (to say), with the meaning of "said", as in the locution "the said story". The first recorded use of ditto with this meaning in English occurs in 1625.

In English, the abbreviation "do.", usually italicised, has sometimes been used instead of ditto marks - see example below, and also in a table in a U.S. Patent.

== Other languages ==
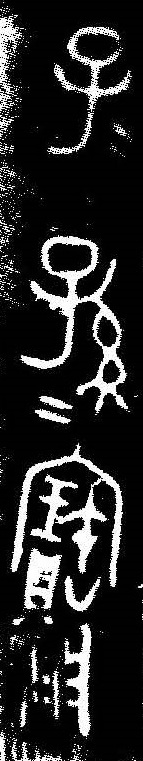
Bronzeware script, c. 825 BCE, showing "子_{𠄠}孫_{𠄠}寶用", where the small 𠄠 ("two") is used as iteration marks in the phrase "子子孫孫寶用" ("descendants to use and to treasure").

Other languages may use equivalent symbols. For example, in Scandinavian handwriting, a version using horizontal lines to indicate the span of the cell in a table where an entry repeats is sometimes seen (––〃––). In French, it is called a guillemet itératif, but the actual symbol used may vary: » is used in Quebec, while in France — is preferred. For Chinese, Japanese and Korean, there is the specific Unicode character U+3003 〃 DITTO MARK in the range CJK Symbols and Punctuation. This facilitates the setting of both marks on a single horizontal line in Asian vertical text.

In China the corresponding historical mark was two horizontal lines 𠄠 (Unicode U+16FE3 𖿣 OLD CHINESE ITERATION MARK), which is also the ancient ideograph of "two", similar to the modern ideograph 二. It is found in bronze script from the Zhou dynasty, as in the example at right (c. 825 BCE). In seal script form this became 〻, and is now written as 々; see iteration mark.

In the Maya script, a pair of small dots may appear above or in front of a glyph to indicate that it should be read twice. This duplication diacritic functions as a phonetic doubling device, typically applied to syllabic signs. For example, the Maya word kakaw ("cacao") can be written with a ka sign marked by two small prefixed dots, signaling that it be read as ka-ka, followed by wa.

== See also ==
- Dittography – Accidental repeating of content in text
- Ibid. – Latin footnote or endnote term referring to the previous source
- Iteration mark – Character or punctuation mark used to represent a duplicated character or word
