= LST 1564 =

Type of character encoding

LST 1564:2000 is a character encoding used to write the Lithuanian language. It is a modification of ISO/IEC 8859-13 to support the accented Lithuanian letters.

== Code page layout ==
The following table shows LST 1564. Each character is shown with its equivalent Unicode code point. Only the second half of the table (code points 128–255) is shown, the first half (code points 0–127) being the same as ASCII.

LST 1564
	0	1	2	3	4	5	6	7	8	9	A	B	C	D	E	F
8x																
9x																
Ax	NBSP	Ą̃	Ę́	Ę̃	i̇̃	L̃	M̃	m̃	Ė́	Ñ	Ė̃	R̃	Ų́	SHY	Ū̃	Ū́
Bx	Ĩ	ą̃	ę́	ę̃	´	l̃	¶	j̇̃	ė́	ñ	ė̃	r̃	ų́	Ų̃	ū̃	ū́
Cx	Ą	Į	À	Á	Ä	Ã	Ę	Ą́	Č	É	È	Ė	Ẽ	Ì	Í	Į́
Dx	Š	Į̃	Ò	Ó	Ý	Õ	Ö	Ũ	Ų	Ù	Ú	Ū	Ü	Ỹ	Ž	ß
Ex	ą	į	à	á	ä	ã	ę	ą́	č	é	è	ė	ẽ	i̇̀	i̇́	į̇́
Fx	š	į̇̃	ò	ó	ý	õ	ö	ũ	ų	ù	ú	ū	ü	ỹ	ž	ų̃
