= Lithuanian Braille =

Braille alphabet of the Lithuanian language

- Script type: alphabet
- Print basis: Lithuanian alphabet
- Languages: Lithuanian

Related scripts
- Parent systems: Braille: Lithuanian Braille

Lithuanian Braille is the braille alphabet of the Lithuanian language.

== Alphabet and digits ==
The alphabet and digits are mapped as follows:

| ⠀ (braille pattern blank) | a, 1 | ą | b, 2 | c, 3 | č | d, 4 | e, 5 | ę | ė | f, 6 | g, 7 |
| h, 8 | i, 9 | į | j, 0 | k | l | m | n | o | p | q | r |
| s | š | t | u | ū | ų | v | w | x | y | z | ž |

Most of the print letters with accents are derived in Lithuanian braille by adding a dot 6 to the base letter, and those which already have a dot 6 through inversion (cf. Czech Braille, Esperanto Braille). Ū uses the international convention for a second u. Ž is unusual, but perhaps forms a set with s, š, z (cf. Hungarian Braille).

Derivation of extended letters
| a | c | e | | i | u | | s | z |
| ą | č | ę | ė | į | ų | ū | š | ž |

Several of these conventions are also used in Polish Braille.

== Punctuation ==
| Print | , | . | ? | ! | ; | : | - | * | / | „ ... ” | ( ... ) |
|---|---|---|---|---|---|---|---|---|---|---|---|
| Braille | ⠂ (braille pattern dots-2) | ⠲ (braille pattern dots-256) | ⠢ (braille pattern dots-26) | ⠖ (braille pattern dots-235) | ⠆ (braille pattern dots-23) | ⠒ (braille pattern dots-25) | ⠤ (braille pattern dots-36) | ⠔ (braille pattern dots-35) | ⠌ (braille pattern dots-34) | ... | ... |

== Signalling marks ==
Due to the limited number of different braille dot combinations, it's impossible to express all different characters using their own distinct dot combinations. To alleviate this, most braille writing systems use additional signalling marks which affect the values of the dot combinations that immediately follow them. The standard marks in Lithuanian braille are:

| ⠼ (braille pattern dots-3456) | ⠨ (braille pattern dots-46) | ⠘ (braille pattern dots-45) | ⠠ (braille pattern dots-6) |
| Number | Single capital letter | Multiple capital letters (e.g. word) | End of number or capital letters |

For example, ⠨⠁⠃ is read as 'Ab', and ⠼⠁⠃ as number '12'.

The cancelling mark ⠠ is only used when necessary, that is, when a number or multiple uppercase letters are immediately followed by a lowercase letter.

== History ==
Lithuanian alphabet was originally adapted for braille by Pranas Daunys in 1927.

In 1999, Daunys' adaptation was revised and aligned more closely with braille alphabets used by other Latin-based languages. Mappings of letters U, V, W, and Z to braille dots were changed to match international convention, affecting mappings for Ė and Ū in the process. This revised Lithuanian braille alphabet was officially mandated for use in education in 2000, and has been in use since.

In addition to the alphabet, a much more complete braille writing system was standardised in 2019 as a National Annex to ISO 17049 (LST ISO 17049/NA). The annex covers braille usage for literary works, math, physics, chemistry, music, chess, and checkers.

== Eight-dot braille ==
Two versions of the eight-dot braille writing system were standardised in 2011. In practice, both of them are barely used, as is acknowledged by the 2019 standard.

The eight-dot braille doesn't use the signalling markers from 6-dot braille mentioned above. Instead, uppercase letters are marked with dot-7 (lower left), and numbers with dot-8 (lower right). For example, ⡁ is read as letter 'A', and ⢁ as digit '1'.
