= O with ogonek =

Latin letter O with ogonek

- Ǫ ǫ

Usage
- Writing system: Latin script
- In Unicode: U+01EA, U+01EB

History
Development
D4
      - Ο ο
        - 𐌏
          - O o
            - Ǫ ǫ

Other
- Writing direction: Left-to-Right

O with an ogonek (majuscule: Ǫ, minuscule: ǫ) is a letter of the Latin alphabet formed by the addition of the ogonek (from Polish: little tail) to the letter O. It is used in Western Apache, Mescalero-Chiricahua, Muscogee, Dadibi, Gwichʼin, Erie, and Navajo. It is also used in the Latin transcription of Old Church Slavonic, and the Proto-Slavic language, as well as in the Slavistic Phonetic Alphabet. It is also still in use for the writing of Old Norse, and used to be used sporadically in Polish.

== Usage ==
The letter is used in the autochthonous languages of North America: Western Apache, Mescalero-Chiricahua, Muscogee, Dadibi, Gwichʼin, Erie, and Navajo. In such languages, it represents either a nasalized close-mid back rounded vowel ([õ]), or a nasalized ([ɔ̃]).

It is also used in the Latin transcription of Old Church Slavonic where it represents the nasal back vowel, as well as in the Proto-Slavic language where it represents a labialized non-front vowel. It is also used in the Slavistic Phonetic Alphabet, where it represents the nasalized O-sound, for example, the pronunciation of Ą in Polish.

It was used in Old Norse, where it represented the open back rounded vowel ([ɒ]) sound. Additionally, the letter sporadically used to be an alternative to Ą in Polish.

In academic transcription of Vulgar Latin, Ǫ represents the open-mid vowel /ɔ/ (contrasted with the close-mid vowel /o/, represented with an underdot (Ọ)).

== Encoding ==
Character information
| Preview | Ǫ | | ǫ | |
|---|---|---|---|---|
| Unicode name | LATIN CAPITAL LETTER O WITH OGONEK | | LATIN SMALL LETTER O WITH OGONEK | |
| Encodings | decimal | hex | dec | hex |
| Unicode | 490 | U+01EA | 491 | U+01EB |
| UTF-8 | 199 170 | C7 AA | 199 171 | C7 AB |
| Numeric character reference | &#490; | &#x1EA; | &#491; | &#x1EB; |
