= Polish Braille =

Braille alphabet of the Polish language

- Script type: alphabet
- Print basis: Polish alphabet
- Languages: Polish

Related scripts
- Parent systems: Braille: Polish Braille

Polish Braille (alfabet Braille'a) is a braille alphabet for writing the Polish language. It is based on international braille conventions, with the following extensions:

Base letter	a	c	e	l	n	s	u	y	z
Derived letter	ą	ć	ę	ł	ń	ś	ó	ż	ź

That is, for letters of the first and second decade of the braille script (a, c, e, l, n, s), a diacritic is written as dot 6, and any dot 3 is removed (or, equivalently, is moved to position 6)—that is, the base letter is moved to the fourth decade. For letters of the third decade (u, y, z), which already have a dot 6, the derivation is a mirror image. Ó is derived from u, which is how it is pronounced (also, the mirror image of o is already taken). Several of these conventions are used in Lithuanian Braille.

== History ==
Some form of a Braille alphabet had been adapted to the Polish language by 1957.

== Alphabet ==
The full alphabet is this:

a	ą	b	c	ć	d	e	ę
f	g	h	i	j	k	l	ł
m	n	ń	o	ó	p	r	s
ś	t	u	w	y	z	ż	ź

Print digraphs in z are written as two letters in braille as well: ⠉⠵ cz, ⠗⠵ rz, ⠎⠵ sz.

== Punctuation ==
,	. '	;	:	?	!	—	@	*	/	\
#		•		%			‰			
°	′	″		$	¢		₤		€	
©		™								

Paired punctuation

... “ ... ”	... ‘ ... ’

... ( ... )	... { ... } (?)

... [ ... ]	... ⟨ ... ⟩

== Formatting ==
(cap)	(l.c.)	(emph.)
