= Ą́ =

Latin letter A with acute and ogonek

A with acute and ogonek
- Ą́ ą́

Usage
- Type: alphabetic
- Language of origin: Chipewyan, Iñapari, Lithuanian, Navajo, Omaha–Ponca, Osage, Winnebago

Ą́, lowercase ą́, is a letter used in the alphabets of Apache, Chipewyan, Iñapari, Lithuanian, Navajo, Omaha–Ponca, Osage, Chickasaw, and Winnebago. It is the letter A with an acute accent and an ogonek.

== Usage ==
In Lithuanian, the letter Ą can be combined with an acute accent to indicate a long syllable tone.

== Computer representations ==
The A acute ogonek can be represented by the following Unicode characters:

- Composed of normalised NFC (Latin Extended-A, Combining Diacritical Marks):

Forms	Representations	Channels of characters	Code points	Descriptions
Capital	Ą́	Ą ◌́	U+0104; U+0301	Capital Latin letter A with ogonek Combining acute
Small	ą́	ą ◌́	U+0105; U+0301	Small Latin letter A with ogonek Combining acute

- Decomposed and normalised NFD (Basic Latin, Combining Diacritical Marks):

Forms	Representations	Channels of characters	Code points	Descriptions
Capital	Ą́	A ◌̨ ◌́	U+0041; U+0328; U+0301	Capital Latin letter a Combining ogonek Combining acute
Small	ą́	a ◌̨ ◌́	U+0061; U+0328; U+0301	Small Latin letter a Combining ogonek Combining acute

== Bibliography ==
- Lithuanian Standards Board, Proposal to add Lithuanian accented letters to the UCS, 5 December 2011. (copy online)
