= Ų́ =

Latin letter U with acute accent and a tail

U with acute and a tail
- Ų́ ų́

Usage
- Type: alphabetic
- Language of origin: Chipewyan, Lithuanian, Ho-Chunk

Ų́, lowercase ų́, is a letter used in the alphabets of Chipewyan, Lithuanian, and Ho-Chunk. It is the letter U with an acute accent and a tail.

== Usage ==
In Lithuanian, the letter Ų can be combined with an acute accent to indicate a long syllable tone.

== Computer representations ==
The U acute ogonek can be represented by the following Unicode characters:

- Composed of normalised NFC (Latin Extended-A, Combining Diacritical Marks):

Forms	Representations	Channels of characters	Code points	Descriptions
Capital	Ų́	Ų ◌́	U+0172; U+0301	Capital Latin letter U with ogonek Combining acute
Small	ų́	ų ◌́	U+0173; U+0301	Small Latin letter U with ogonek Combining acute

- Decomposed and normalised NFD (Basic Latin, Combining Diacritical Marks):

Forms	Representations	Channels of characters	Code points	Descriptions
Capital	Ų́	U ◌̨ ◌́	U+0055; U+0328; U+0301	Capital Latin letter u Combining ogonek Combining acute
Small	ų́	u ◌̨ ◌́	U+0075; U+0328; U+0301	Small Latin letter u Combining ogonek Combining acute

== Bibliography ==
- Lithuanian Standards Board, Proposal to add Lithuanian accented letters to the UCS, 5 December 2011. (copy online)
