= Slavic alphabet =

Slavic alphabet may refer to any of the following scripts designed specifically for writing Slavic languages (note: a number of Slavic languages, including all West Slavic and some South Slavic, are written in the Latin script):

- Glagolitic script
- Cyrillic script (also used for non-Slavic languages)
  - Early Cyrillic alphabet
  - Belarusian alphabet
  - Bulgarian alphabet
  - Macedonian alphabet
  - Russian alphabet
  - Rusyn alphabets
  - Serbian Cyrillic alphabet
  - Ukrainian alphabet
- "Cherty i rezy", a vague reference to non-attested pre-Christian Slavic writing
- Slavistic Phonetic Alphabet
