= Türmitz =

Türmitz may refer to:

- Ciermięcice, village in Poland
- Trmice, town in the Czech Republic
