= LST 1590 =

Lithuanian standard defining character encodings

The Lithuanian standard LST 1590 defines character encodings to be used for the Lithuanian language, and consists of the following parts:

- LST 1590-1 (DOS code page 775)
- LST 1590-2 (code page 778, modification of code page 775)
- LST 1590-3 (Windows code page 1257)
- LST 1590-4 (modification of code page 1257)
