= Ę́ =

Latin letter E with acute accent and ogonek

E with acute and ogonek
- Ę́ ę́

Usage
- Type: alphabetic
- Language of origin: Chipewyan, Iñapari, Lithuanian, Navajo, Omaha–Ponca, Tuscarora

Ę́, lowercase ę́, is a letter used in the alphabets of Chipewyan, Iñapari, Lithuanian, Navajo, Omaha–Ponca, and Tuscarora. It is the letter E with an acute accent and an ogonek.

== Usage ==
In Lithuanian, the letter Ę can be combined with an acute accent to indicate a long syllable tone.

== Computer representations ==
The E acute ogonek can be represented by the following Unicode characters:

- Composed of normalised NFC (Latin Extended-A, Combining Diacritical Marks):

Forms	Representations	Channels of characters	Code points	Descriptions
Capital	Ę́	Ę ◌́	U+0118; U+0301	Capital Latin letter E with ogonek Combining acute
Small	ę́	ę ◌́	U+0119; U+0301	Small Latin letter E with ogonek Combining acute

- Decomposed and normalised NFD (Basic Latin, Combining Diacritical Marks):

Forms	Representations	Channels of characters	Code points	Descriptions
Capital	Ę́	E ◌̨ ◌́	U+0045; U+0328; U+0301	Capital Latin letter e Combining ogonek Combining acute
Small	ę́	e ◌̨ ◌́	U+0065; U+0328; U+0301	Small Latin letter e Combining ogonek Combining acute

== Bibliography ==
- Lithuanian Standards Board, Proposal to add Lithuanian accented letters to the UCS, 5 December 2011. (copy online)

== See also ==
- E
- Acute accent
- Ogonek
