= Lithuanian orthography =

Orthography of the Lithuanian language

Lithuanian alphabet Lietuvių abėcėlė
- Script type: Alphabet
- Period: 1906 – present
- Languages: Lithuanian

Related scripts
- Parent systems: Egyptian hieroglyphs: Proto-Sinaitic alphabet; Phoenician alphabet; Greek alphabet; Old Italic scripts; Latin alphabet; Czech alphabet (partly Polish alphabet); Lithuanian alphabet
- Child systems: Samogitian alphabet

Unicode
- Unicode range: Subset of Latin

Lithuanian orthography employs a Latin-script alphabet of 32 letters, two of which denote sounds not native to the Lithuanian language. Additionally, it uses five digraphs.

== Alphabet ==
Today, the Lithuanian alphabet consists of 32 letters. It features an unusual collation order in that "Y" occurs between I nosinė (Į) and J. While absent from the alphabet, letters Q, W and X have their place in collation order: Q is located between P and R, and W with X are preceded by letter V. Those letters may be used in spelling of foreign names.

Lithuanian alphabet
Majuscule forms (also called uppercase or capital letters)
A	Ą	B	C	Č	D	E	Ę	Ė	F	G	H	I	Į	Y	J	K	L	M	N	O	P	R	S	Š	T	U	Ų	Ū	V	Z	Ž
Minuscule forms (also called lowercase or small letters)
a	ą	b	c	č	d	e	ę	ė	f	g	h	i	į	y	j	k	l	m	n	o	p	r	s	š	t	u	ų	ū	v	z	ž
Names of letters
a	a nosinė	bė	cė	čė	dė	e	e nosinė	ė	ef	gė	ha	i trumpoji	i nosinė	i ilgoji	jot	ka	el	em	en	o	pė	er	es	eš	tė	u trumpoji	u nosinė	u ilgoji	vė	zė	žė

The distinctive Lithuanian letter Ė was used for the first time in Daniel Klein's Grammatica Litvanica, and has been firmly established in the Lithuanian language since then. However, linguist August Schleicher used Ë (with two points above it) instead of Ė for expressing the same. In the Grammatica Litvanica Klein also established the letter W for marking the sound V, the use of which was later abolished in the Lithuanian language (it was replaced with letter V, notably by authors of the Varpas newspaper). The usage of letter V instead of W especially increased since the early 20th century, likely considerably influenced by Lithuanian press and schools.

Due to the Polish influence, the Lithuanian alphabet included sz, cz and the Polish Ł for the sound [ɫ] and regular L (without a following i) for the sound [lʲ]: łupa, lutas. During the Lithuanian National Revival in the 19th century the Polish Ł was abolished, while digraphs sz, cz (that are also common in the Polish orthography) were replaced with letters š and č from the Czech orthography, formally because they were shorter. Nevertheless, another argument to abolish digraphs sz, cz was to distinguish the Lithuanian language from the Polish language. The new letters š and č were cautiously used in publications intended for more educated readers (e.g. Varpas, Tėvynės sargas, Ūkininkas), however digraphs sz, cz continued to be in use in publications intended for less educated readers as š and č caused tension in society; š and č have prevailed only since 1906.

The Lithuanians also adopted letter ž from the Czechs.

The letters ą and ę were taken from the Polish spelling for what at the time were nasal vowels. They were first used by Renaissance Lithuanian writers. Later the letters į and ų were introduced for the remaining nasal vowels, which have since denasalized. Letter ū is the latest addition by linguist Jonas Jablonskis in 1901.

Acute, grave, and macron/tilde accents can mark stress and vowel length. However, these are generally not used, except in dictionaries and where needed for clarity. In addition, Lithuanian orthography uses five digraphs (Ch Dz Dž Ie Uo); these function as sequences of two letters for collation purposes. The "Ch" digraph represents a voiceless velar fricative, while the others are straightforward compositions of their component letters. The letters F and H, as well as the digraph CH, denote sounds only appearing in loanwords.

== Spelling of foreign names ==
Two spelling variants are used for foreign personal names: original spelling (e.g. George Walker Bush as a title of an encyclopedic article or as a name of an author of a book, or George'as Walkeris Bushas in a sentence, conforming to the Lithuanian morphology) and phonetic spelling adapted to the Lithuanian phonology (e.g. Džordžas Volkeris Bušas). In Soviet times, phonetic spelling was the only standard way to write foreign names in Lithuanian (original spelling could be shown in parentheses if needed), but in post-Soviet times the original spelling came to be widely used. The Lithuanian Wikipedia uses original spelling in article titles, but phonetic spelling in article texts.

== Q, W, and X ==
The Lithuanian alphabet lacks Q (kū), W (vė dviguboji) and X (iks) of the ISO basic Latin alphabet. They are only used in foreign words, personal names of foreign origin, as well as expressions and in international symbols.

== Sound–spelling correspondences ==
Vowels
Grapheme	Sound (IPA)	
Grapheme	Short	Long
a	ɐ	äː
ą		äː
e	ɛ~e̞	æː
ę		æː
ė		eː
i	ɪ	
į		iː
y		iː
o	ɔ	oː
u	ʊ	
ų		uː
ū		uː

⟨o⟩ is short only in loanwords. ⟨a e⟩ are always short without accent and under accent in endings -a, -e, -es, in comparative, in pronouns, and in loanwords; otherwise, they are usually long.

Consonants
Grapheme	Sound (IPA)	
Grapheme	Hard	Soft
b	b	bʲ
c	t̪͡s̪	t͡sʲ
č	t͡ʃ	t͡ɕ
ch	x	xʲ
d	d̪	dʲ
dz	d̪͡z̪	d͡zʲ
dž	d͡ʒ	d͡ʑ
f	f	fʲ
g	ɡ	ɡʲ
h	ɣ	ɣʲ
j		j
k	k	kʲ
l	ɫ	lʲ
m	m	mʲ
n	n̪	nʲ
p	p	pʲ
r	ɾ	ɾʲ
s	s̪	sʲ
š	ʃ	ɕ
t	t̪	tʲ
v	v	vʲ
z	z̪	zʲ
ž	ʒ	ʑ

Consonants are always palatalized before ⟨e ę ė i į y⟩; before ⟨a ą o u ų ū⟩, palatalization is denoted by inserting an ⟨i⟩ between the consonant and the vowel.

== Unicode ==
The majority of the Lithuanian alphabet is in the Unicode block C0 controls and basic Latin (non-accented symbols), and the rest of the Lithuanian alphabet (Ą ą Č č Ę ę Ė ė Į į Š š Ų ų Ū ū Ž ž) is in the Latin Extended-A.

== See also ==
- Lithuanian phonology
- Lithuanian grammar

== General sources ==
- Venckienė, Jurgita (2017). "Lietuviški XIX a. pabaigos ir XX a. pradžios antkapių užrašai: santykis su bendrine kalba" (PDF). Archivum Lithuanicum (in Lithuanian) (19). Vilnius: Lithuanian Institute of History.
