= Ą̃ =

Latin letter A with tilde and ogonek

A tilde ogonek
- Ą̃ ą̃

Usage
- Language of origin: Lithuanian

Ą̃ (minuscule: ą̃), called A tilde ogonek, is a Latin letter used in the writing of the Lithuanian language. It consists of the letter A diacriticised with a tilde and an ogonek.

== Usage ==
In Lithuanian, the A ogonek ⟨Ą, ą⟩ can be combined with a tilde to indicate a tonic syllable: ⟨Ą̃, ą̃⟩.

== Computer representations ==
The A tilde ogonek can be represented by the following Unicode characters:

- Composed of normalised NFC (Latin Extended-A, Combining Diacritical Marks) :

Forms	Representations	Channels of characters	Code points	Descriptions
Capital	Ą̃	Ą ◌̃	U+0104; U+0303	Capital Latin letter A with ogonek Combining tilde
Small	ą̃	ą ◌̃	U+0105; U+0303	Small Latin letter A with ogonek Combining tilde

- Decomposed and normalised NFD (Basic Latin, Combining Diacritical Marks) :

Forms	Representations	Channels of characters	Code points	Descriptions
Capital	Ą̃	A ◌̨ ◌̃	U+0041; U+0328; U+0303	Capital Latin letter a Combining ogonek Combining tilde
Small	ą̃	a ◌̨ ◌̃	U+0061; U+0328; U+0303	Small Latin letter a Combining ogonek Combining tilde

== See also ==
- A
- Tilde
- Ogonek

== Bibliography ==
- Lithuanian Standards Board, Proposal to add Lithuanian accented letters to the UCS, 5 December 2011. (copy online)
