= Language program director =

A Language Program Director (LPD) is a usually senior academic position in United States universities. In some institutions a LPD can also be referred to as a 'Language Program Coordinator' (LPC), while in others the LPD has a hierarchically higher position than an LPC, the latter coordinating just one course level.

LPDs usually coordinate all levels of instruction of undergraduate language programs, as well as develop policy related to program administration. They are also responsible for marketing, student recruitment, human resources and budgetary matters. Unlike administrators of other academic units, language program directors are often mandated to generate significant revenue for the institutions they work for.

Most LPDs are not on a tenure-track because traditionally linguistic studies have been considered by Departments of Foreign Languages and Literatures as less important than literary studies. According to a recent MLA report, this is a trend that should be reversed. In the past LPD positions were generally filled by people - usually women - with degrees in literature and no training in second language acquisition or applied linguistics. This has resulted in a lack of innovation in US language programs. Recently, however, more and more universities are looking for new program directors with specific training in applied linguistics., and are offering their LPDs tenure-track positions.

A useful source of information for LPDs is the American Association of University Supervisors and Coordinators (AAUSC)
