= Ų =

Latin letter U with ogonek

U with ogonek
- Ų ų

Usage
- Writing system: Latin script
- Type: alphabetic
- Language of origin: Assiniboine; Chipewyan; Dadibi; Dalecarlian; Elfdalian; Gwichʼin; Hän; Interslavic; Iñapari; Ixtlán Zapotec; Kaska; Lithuanian; Sierra Otomi; Sekani; Tagish; Tlingit; Tutchone; Winnebago
- In Unicode: U+0172, U+0173

History
- Transliterations: ũ

Other
- Writing direction: Left-to-Right

U with ogonek (majuscule: Ų, minuscule: ų) is a letter of the Latin alphabet formed by addition of the ogonek to the letter U. It is used in Lithuanian, Interslavic, Chipewyan, Dadibi, Dalecarlian, Gwichʼin, Hän, Iñapari, Kaska, Sierra Otomi, Sekani, Tagish, Tlingit, Tutchone, Winnebago, and Ixtlán Zapotec.

== Usage ==
In Lithuanian, it is the 28th letter of the alphabet, and is pronounced as long close back rounded vowel ([uː]). In the past, the letter was used to denote the nasalized close back rounded vowel ([ũ]). Currently, it appears in the words that used to be nasalized in the past, for example in siųsti, which means send.

It is used in Interslavic to denote the etymological presence of a big yus, which evolved into different sounds in Polish, Slovene and Bulgarian compared to the other Slavic languages. The pronunciation ([o] ~ [ʊ]) depends on the accent of the speaker.

The letter also appears in various Indigenous languages of North America, which are: Chipewyan, Dadibi, Dalecarlian, Gwichʼin, Hän, Iñapari, Kaska, Sierra Otomi, Sekani, Tagish, Tlingit, Tutchone, Winnebago, and Ixtlán Zapotec. In most of them, the letter represent the nasalized close back rounded vowel ([ũ]).

== Encoding ==
Character information
Preview	Ų		ų	
Unicode name	LATIN CAPITAL LETTER U WITH OGONEK		LATIN SMALL LETTER U WITH OGONEK	
Encodings	decimal	hex	dec	hex
Unicode	370	U+0172	371	U+0173
UTF-8	197 178	C5 B2	197 179	C5 B3
Numeric character reference	&#370;	&#x172;	&#371;	&#x173;
Named character reference	&Uogon;		&uogon;	
