= Chomiąża, Opole Voivodeship =

Chomiąża
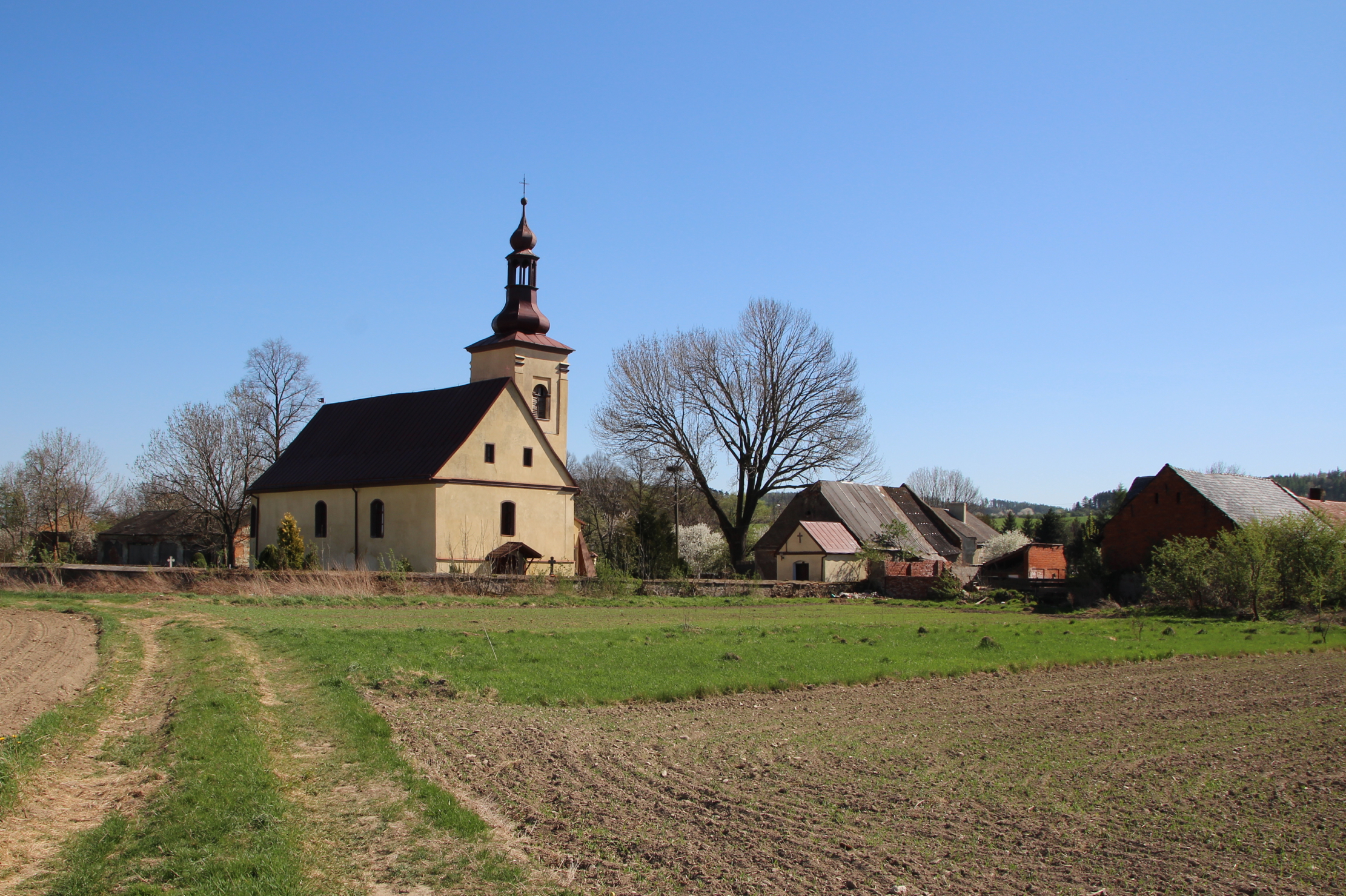

- Location within Poland
- Coordinates: 50°6′33″N 17°39′46″E
- Country: Poland
- Voivodeship: Opole
- County: Głubczyce
- Gmina: Głubczyce
- Time zone: UTC+1 (CET)
  - Summer (DST): UTC+2 (CEST)
- Area code: +48 77
- Car plates: OGL

Chomiąża [xɔˈmjɔ̃ʐa] is a village located in Poland, in the Opole Voivodeship, Głubczyce County and Gmina Głubczyce.

== History ==
The present-day Polish village Chomiąża and the present-day Czech village Chomyž, directly across the Czech side of the border, were once a single village. After the Silesian Wars, the newly drawn border divided the village in two. The division continued through the Communist era of 1945–1990, and the border was not easily crossed until the two countries joined the Schengen Area in 2007.

== Location ==
The village is situated about 17 kilometres (11 mi) south-west of the centre of Głubczyce.
