= E =

Fifth letter of the Latin alphabet

- E e

Usage
- Writing system: Latin script
- Type: Alphabetic
- Language of origin: Latin language
- Sound values: [e]; [e̞]; [ɛ]; [æ]; [ə]; [ɪ]; [i]; [ɘ]; [ɨ]; [j]; [ɐ]; [ɐi]; [ei]; [ɛi]
- In Unicode: U+0045, U+0065
- Alphabetical position: 5

History
Development
A28
  - 𐤄
    - Ε ε ϵ
      - 𐌄
        - E e
- Time period: c. 700 BCE to present
- Descendants: Ə; Æ; Œ; €; ℮; Ǝ; ∈; ℯ; ℇ; ℰ; ℥; &
- Sisters: Е; Э; Є; Ё; Ә; Һ; ה ه ܗ; Ɛ; Ե ե; Է է; Ը ը; ࠄ; 𐎅; Ⲉ

Other
- Associated graphs: ee, e(x), e(x)(y)
- Writing direction: Left-to-right

E (minuscule: e) is the fifth letter in the Latin alphabet as well as the second vowel in the vowel sequence of AEIOU. It is used in the modern English alphabet and is also found in the alphabets of many European and some Asian languages. Its name in English is e (pronounced /ˈiː/); plural es, Es, or E's.

== Name ==
In English, the name of the letter is the "long E" sound, pronounced /ˈiː/. In most other languages, its name matches the letter's pronunciation in open syllables.

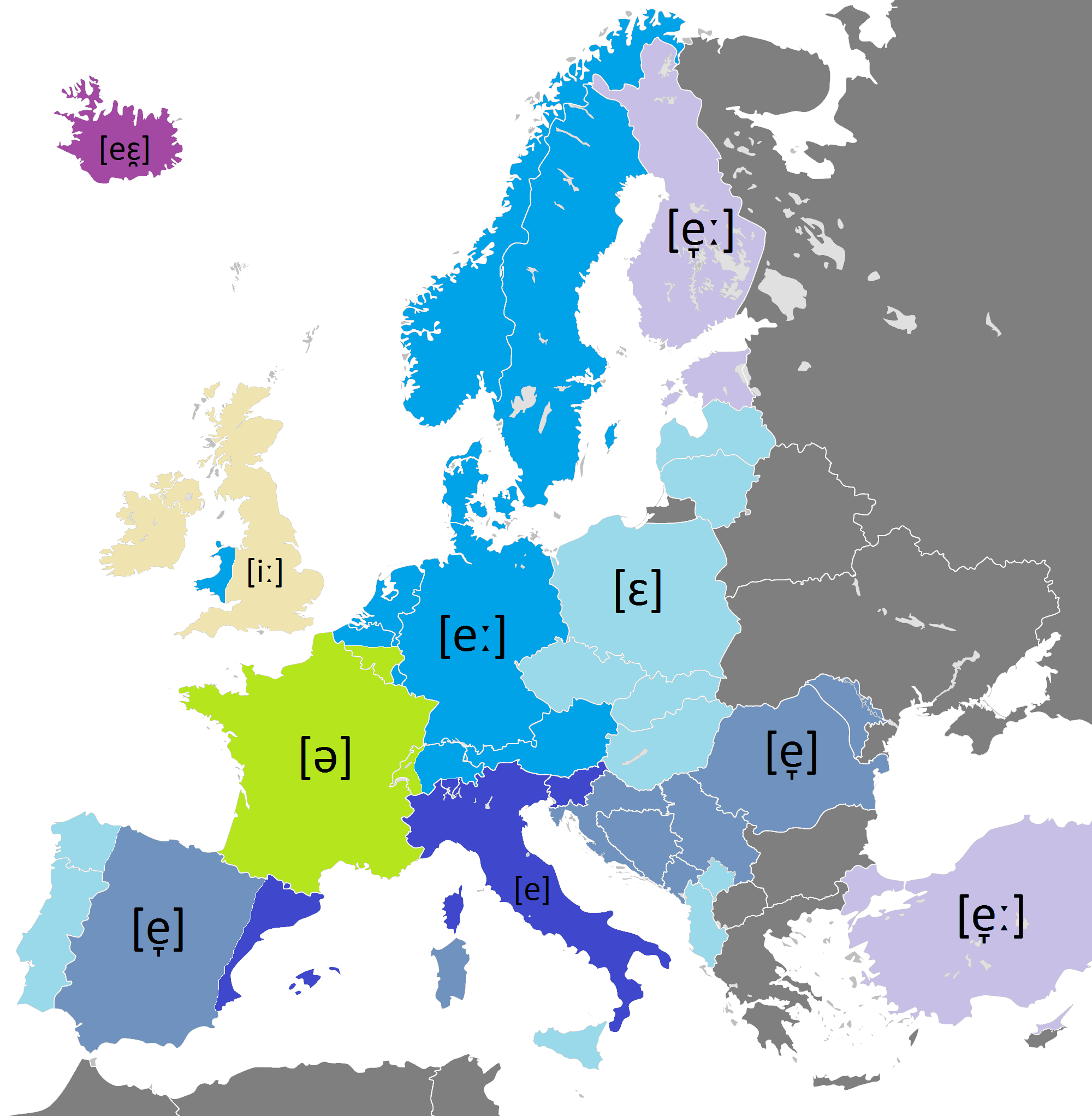
Pronunciation of the name of the letter ⟨e⟩ in European languages

== History ==
Egyptian hieroglyph qʼ	Proto-Sinaitic	Proto-Canaanite hillul	Phoenician He	Western Greek Epsilon	Etruscan E	Latin E
A28						Latin E

The Latin letter 'E' differs little from its source, the Greek letter epsilon, 'Ε'. This in turn comes from the Semitic letter hê, which has been suggested to have started as a praying or calling human figure (hillul, 'jubilation'), and was most likely based on a similar Egyptian hieroglyph that indicated a different pronunciation.

In Semitic, the letter represented /h/ (and /e/ in foreign words); in Greek, hê became the letter epsilon, used to represent /e/. The various forms of the Old Italic script and the Latin alphabet followed this usage.

== Use in writing systems ==
Pronunciation of ⟨e⟩ by language
Orthography	Phonemes
Catalan	/ə/, /ɛ/, /e/ (also /i/, /a/ or silent dial.)
Standard Chinese (Pinyin)	/ə/
English	/ɛ/, /iː/, /ə/, /ɜː/, /ɪə/
French	/ə/, /ɛ/, /e/
German	/ɛ/, /eː/, /e/
Italian	/e/, /ɛ/
Portuguese	/ɛ/, /e/, /i/, /ɨ/, /j/, /ɐ/, /ɐj/
Spanish	/e/
Turkish	/e/

=== English ===
Although Middle English spelling used ⟨e⟩ to represent long and short /e/, the Great Vowel Shift changed long /eː/ (as in me or bee) to /iː/ while short /ɛ/ (as in met or bed) remained a mid vowel. In unstressed syllables, this letter is usually pronounced either as /ɪ/ or /ə/. In other cases, the letter is silent, generally at the end of words like queue.

=== Other languages ===
In the orthography of many languages, it represents either [e], [e̞], [ɛ], or some variation (such as a nasalized version) of these sounds, often with diacritics (as: ⟨e ê é è ë ē ĕ ě ẽ ė ẹ ę ẻ⟩) to indicate contrasts. Less commonly, as in French, German, or Saanich, ⟨e⟩ represents a mid-central vowel /ə/. Digraphs with ⟨e⟩ are common to indicate either diphthongs or monophthongs, such as ⟨ea⟩ or ⟨ee⟩ for /iː/ or /eɪ/ in English, ⟨ei⟩ for /aɪ/ in German, and ⟨eu⟩ for /ø/ in French or /ɔɪ/ in German.

=== Other systems ===
The International Phonetic Alphabet uses ⟨e⟩ for the close-mid front unrounded vowel or the mid front unrounded vowel.

=== Frequency ===
E is the most common (or highest-frequency) letter in the English language alphabet and several other European languages, which has implications in both cryptography and data compression. This makes it a harder letter to use when writing lipograms.

== Other uses ==
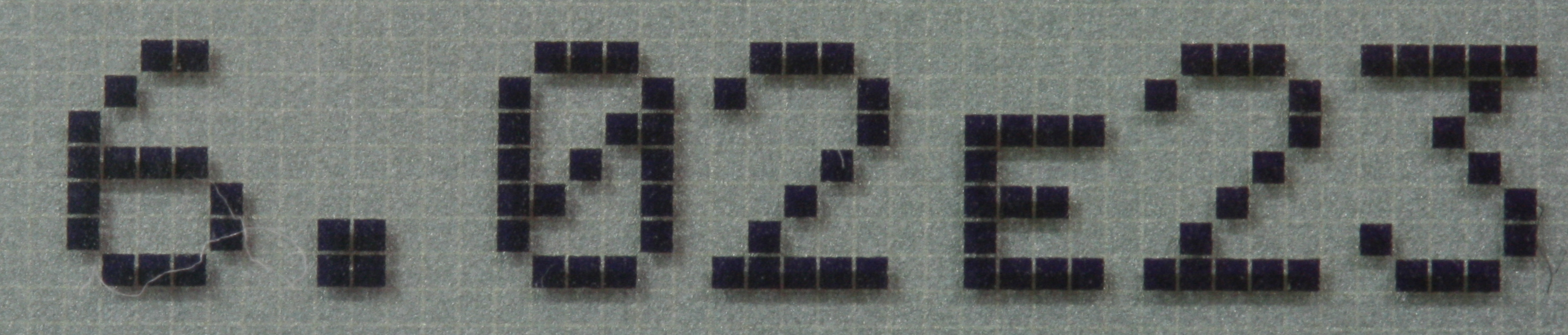
A scientific calculator display showing the Avogadro constant (6.02214076×10^{23} reciprocal moles) in E notation

- In the hexadecimal (base 16) numbering system, "E" corresponds to the number 14 in decimal (base 10) counting.
- "e" is also commonly used to denote Euler's number.

== Related characters ==
=== Descendants and related characters in the Latin alphabet ===
- E with diacritics: Ĕ ĕ Ḝ ḝ Ȇ ȇ Ê ê Ê̄ ê̄ Ê̌ ê̌ Ề ề Ế ế Ể ể Ễ ễ Ệ ệ Ẻ ẻ Ḙ ḙ Ě ě Ɇ ɇ Ė ė Ė́ ė́ Ė̃ ė̃ Ẹ ẹ Ë ë È è È̩ è̩ Ȅ ȅ É é É̩ Ē ē Ḕ ḕ Ḗ ḗ Ẽ ẽ Ḛ ḛ Ę ę Ę́ ę́ Ę̃ ę̃ Ȩ ȩ E̩ e̩ ᶒ
- ⱸ: E with notch is used in the Swedish Dialect Alphabet
- Æ æ: Latin AE ligature
- Œ œ: Latin OE ligature
- The umlaut diacritic ¨ used above a vowel letter in German and other languages to indicate a fronted or front vowel (this sign originated as a superscript e)
- Phonetic alphabet symbols related to E (the International Phonetic Alphabet only uses lowercase, but uppercase forms are used in some other writing systems):
  - Ɛ ɛ: Latin letter epsilon / open e, which represents an open-mid front unrounded vowel in the IPA
  - ᶓ: Epsilon / open e with retroflex hook
  - Ɜ ɜ: Latin letter reversed epsilon / open e, which represents an open-mid central unrounded vowel in the IPA
  - ɝ: Latin small letter reversed epsilon / open e with hook, which represents a rhotacized open-mid central vowel in the IPA
  - ᶔ: Reversed epsilon / open e with retroflex hook
  - ᶟ: Modifier letter small reversed epsilon / open e
  - ɞ: Latin small letter closed reversed open e, which represents an open-mid central rounded vowel in IPA (shown as ʚ on the 1993 IPA chart)
  - 𐞏: Modifier letter small closed reversed open e, which is a superscript IPA letter
  - Ə ə: Latin letter schwa, which represents a mid central vowel in the IPA
  - Ǝ ǝ: Latin letter turned e, which is used in the writing systems of some African languages
  - ɘ: Latin letter reversed e, which represents a close-mid central unrounded vowel in the IPA
  - 𐞎: Modifier letter small reversed e, which is a superscript IPA letter
- The Uralic Phonetic Alphabet uses various forms of e and epsilon / open e:
  - U+1D07 ᴇ LATIN LETTER SMALL CAPITAL E
  - U+1D08 ᴈ LATIN SMALL LETTER TURNED OPEN E
  - U+1D31 ᴱ MODIFIER LETTER CAPITAL E
  - U+1D32 ᴲ MODIFIER LETTER CAPITAL REVERSED E
  - U+1D49 ᵉ MODIFIER LETTER SMALL E
  - U+1D4B ᵋ MODIFIER LETTER SMALL OPEN E
  - U+1D4C ᵌ MODIFIER LETTER SMALL TURNED OPEN E
  - U+2C7B ⱻ LATIN LETTER SMALL CAPITAL TURNED E
- ₑ: Subscript small e is used in Indo-European studies
- Teuthonista phonetic transcription system symbols related to E:
  - U+AB32 ꬲ LATIN SMALL LETTER BLACKLETTER E
  - U+AB33 ꬳ LATIN SMALL LETTER BARRED E
  - U+AB34 ꬴ LATIN SMALL LETTER E WITH FLOURISH
- English Phonotypic Alphabet symbols related to E:
  - U+1DF81 𝾁 LATIN CAPITAL LETTER E WITH BENT TOPBAR
  - U+1DF6C 𝽬 LATIN CAPITAL LETTER REVERSED SCRUPLE

=== Ancestors and siblings in other alphabets ===
- 𐤄: Semitic letter He (letter), from which the following symbols originally derive:
  - Ε ε: Greek letter Epsilon, from which the following symbols originally derive:
    - Е е: Cyrillic letter Ye
    - Є є: Ukrainian Ye
    - Э э: Cyrillic letter E
    - Ⲉ ⲉ: Coptic letter Ei
    - 𐌄: Old Italic E, which is the ancestor of modern Latin E
      - ᛖ: Runic letter Ehwaz, which is possibly a descendant of Old Italic E
    - 𐌴: Gothic letter eyz

=== Derived signs, symbols and abbreviations ===
- €: Euro sign.
- ℮: estimated sign (used on prepackaged goods for sale within the European Union).
- e: the symbol for the elementary charge (the electric charge carried by a single proton).
- ∃: existential quantifier in predicate logic. It is read "there exists ... such that".
- ∈: the symbol for set membership in set theory.
- 𝑒: the base of the natural logarithm.

== Other representations ==
=== Computing ===
Character information
Preview	E		e		Ｅ		ｅ	
Unicode name	LATIN CAPITAL LETTER E		LATIN SMALL LETTER E		FULLWIDTH LATIN CAPITAL LETTER E		FULLWIDTH LATIN SMALL LETTER E	
Encodings	decimal	hex	dec	hex	dec	hex	dec	hex
Unicode	69	U+0045	101	U+0065	65317	U+FF25	65349	U+FF45
UTF-8	69	45	101	65	239 188 165	EF BC A5	239 189 133	EF BD 85
Numeric character reference	&#69;	&#x45;	&#101;	&#x65;	&#65317;	&#xFF25;	&#65349;	&#xFF45;
EBCDIC family	197	C5	133	85				
ASCII (Note: Also for encodings based on ASCII, including the DOS, Windows, ISO-8859 and Macintosh families of encodings.)	69	45	101	65				

=== Other ===
NATO phonetic	Morse code
Echo	▄

Signal flag

Flag semaphore
American manual alphabet (ASL fingerspelling)
British manual alphabet (BSL fingerspelling)
Braille dots-15
Unified English Braille

In British Sign Language (BSL), the letter 'e' is signed by extending the index finger of the right hand touching the tip of index on the left hand, with all fingers of left hand open.

== See also ==
- E notation: used by scientific calculators to indicate a power of ten multiplier
- E-number – Codes for food additives
