= Ciermięcice =

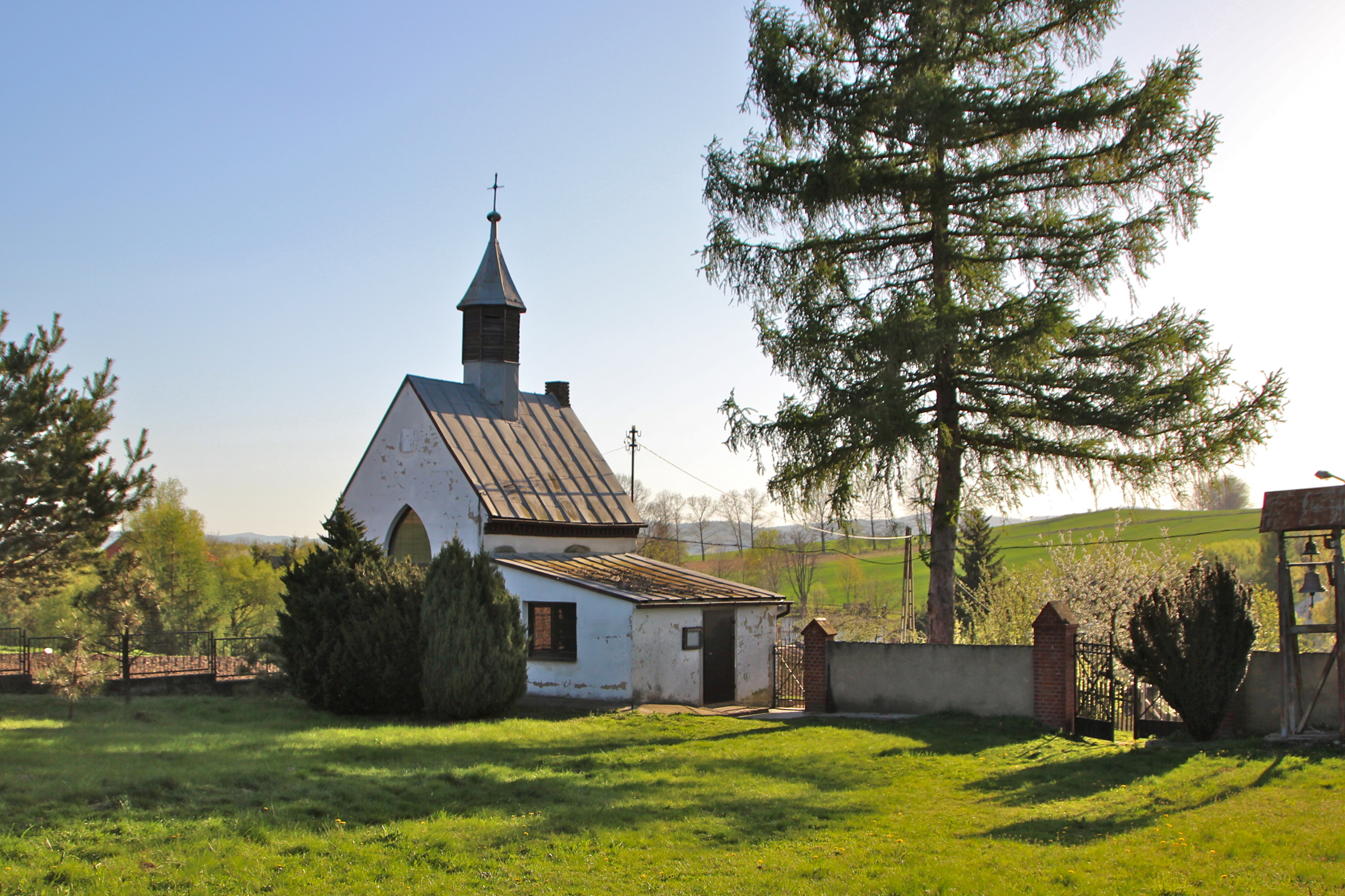

- Location within Poland
- Coordinates: 50°6′43″N 17°43′4″E
- Country: Poland
- Voivodeship: Opole
- County: Głubczyce
- Gmina: Głubczyce
- Time zone: UTC+1 (CET)
  - Summer (DST): UTC+2 (CEST)
- Area code: +48 77
- Car plates: OGL

Ciermięcice [t͡ɕɛrmjɛnˈt͡ɕit͡sɛ] (formerly Tirmanz) is a village located in Poland, in the Opole Voivodeship, Głubczyce County and Gmina Głubczyce.

Potok Ciermięcicki, the left tributary of the Opava river, flows through the village.
