= Slavistic Phonetic Alphabet =

Slavistic Phonetic Alphabet (Polish: Slawistyczny alfabet fonetyczny) is a phonetic transcription system adapted for the use with Slavic languages. In contrast to the International Phonetic Alphabet, it represents affricate constants as singular characters. The two main principles in the creation of the system were: having every phone represented by a singular character, and having the same phones represented always by the same character.
