= R̃ =

Latin letter R with tilde

R̃ (lower case: r̃), is a Latin R with a diacritical tilde.

In Lithuanian, the R with tilde “R̃, r̃” is rarely used and is found in some grammar texts, dictionaries or textbooks. The tilde is used like the circumflex, it indicates the long tonic accent. Therefore, the R with a tilde indicates an /r/ that is part of a diphthong with a tonic accent.

It is not to be confused with Ȓ (R with inverted breve), R̄ (R with macron) or Ř (R with háček).

It was used in the Albanian Agimi alphabet for the voiced alveolar trill, now represented by the digraph Rr.

It is also used in Hausa to differentiate the alveolar tap /ɾ/, represented by R, from the retroflex one.

In the International Phonetic Alphabet, [r̃] represents a nasalized alveolar trill. It is a combination of the IPA symbols ⟨r⟩, an alveolar trill (often called the rolled R in English), combined with the tilde diacritic, which indicates nasalization. PHOIBLE lists the phoneme [r̃] as an attested sound segment in 10 languages, mostly located in the equatorial regions of Africa.
