= M̃ =

Latin letter M with tilde

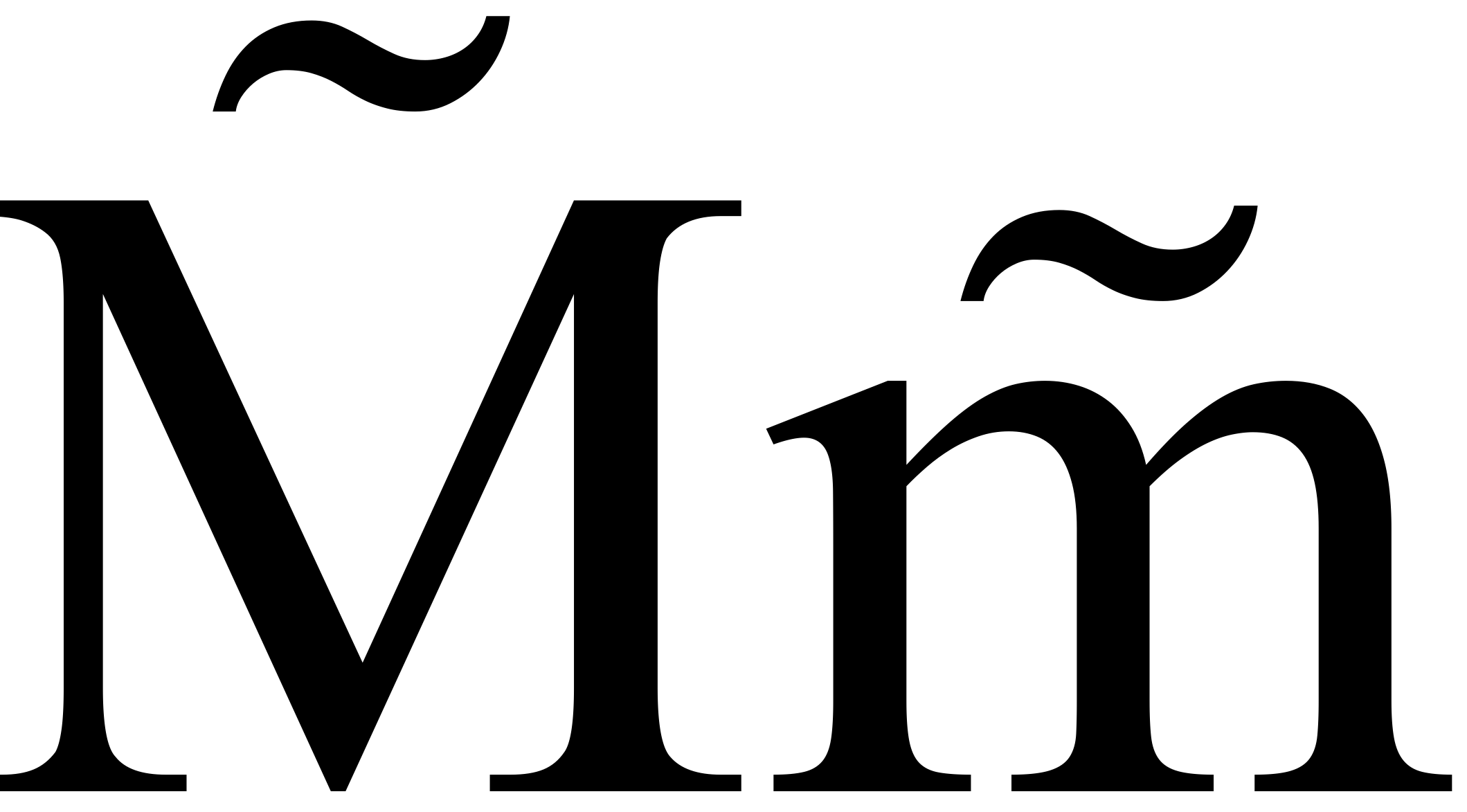
M with tilde in Doulos SIL

M with tilde (majuscule: M̃, minuscule: m̃), also called m tilde, is a Latin M with a diacritical tilde. It is used in orthographies of several languages of Vanuatu or the orthography of Yaneshaʼ in Peru. It has been as a medieval abbreviation in languages such as Latin. It is also used in Lithuanian in didactical notation used in dictionaries or linguistic material.

== Linguistic use ==
M̃–m̃ is or was used as a grapheme in several languages:

- in some languages of Vanuatu, such as North Efate, South Efate and Namakura, it represents a labial-velar nasal [ŋ͡m]. The letter was introduced by missionaries and has been in use for over a hundred years. (Other Vanuatu languages use an M-macron (m̄) instead.)
- in the Yanesha' language of Peru, m̃ represents a palatalized m
- in Lithuanian didactical notation, m̃ appears as part of diphthongs
- in the transliteration of the Lycian script, it represents a syllabic m.

In Italian, the abbreviation Ssm̃o or SSm̃o may be used for Santissimo, "most holy" (similarly Latin Ssm̃us for Sanctissimus).

== Symbolic use ==
M̃ and m̃ are used in mathematics and physics, see Tilde#Mathematics and Tilde#Physics

== Computer use ==
Characters consisting of the base letter M or m followed by a combining tilde mark are used in digital encoding systems rather than as single precomposed characters.

In Unicode, both uppercase and lowercase forms are represented with the base letter followed by the combining tilde (U+0303): Uppercase: U+004D (Latin capital letter M) + U+0303 (combining tilde) Lowercase: U+006D (Latin small letter m) + U+0303 (combining tilde)

In HTML and XML, combining tildes may be encoded either by numeric character references or by named entities for the combining mark:

 M̃ → M̃ or M̃ m̃ → m̃ or m̃ 

In LaTeX, the tilde diacritic can be applied using the \~{} command:

 \~{M} produces Ṁ (uppercase M̃) \~{m} produces ṁ (lowercase m̃) 

Common input methods on major operating systems vary.

Windows: use the US International keyboard layout and type ~ followed by m or M.

macOS: press Option + n to register the tilde accent, then type m or M. On the Apple ABC extended keyboard, m̃ is made by typing m and then option-shift n.

Linux: with a Compose key, press Compose, ~, m. These methods ensure consistent rendering of M̃ and m̃ across applications and platforms.
