= Dadibi language =

Language of eastern Papua New Guinea

Dadibi
- Native to: Papua New Guinea
- Region: Simbu Province and Southern Highlands Province
- Native speakers: (13,000 cited 2000 census)
- Language family: Papuan Gulf ?: Tua River; Teberan; Dadibi
- Writing system: Latin

Language codes
- ISO 639-3: mps
- Glottolog: dadi1250

Dadibi (also Daribi or Karimui) is a language of eastern Papua New Guinea. In 2001, the Bible (including the Old Testament) was translated into Dadibi.

== Distribution ==
Dadibi is spoken in:

- Chimbu Province: Karimui-Nomane District, Tua River system
- Southern Highlands Province: Kagua-Erave District, southeast corner, 28 villages
- Jiwaka Province: southern extremity, South Waghi Rural LLG

== Phonology ==
Consonant phonemes of Dadibi
		Labial	Alveolar	Palatal	Velar	Glottal
Nasal		m	n			
Plosive	Plain	p	t		k	
Plosive	Aspirated	pʰ	tʰ		kʰ	
Fricative			s			h
Approximant		w		j		
Tap			ɾ			

Vowel phonemes of Dadibi
	Front	Back
Close	i ĩ	u ũ
Mid	e̞ ẽ̞	o̞ õ̞
Open	a ã	
