= Ho-Chunk language =

Siouan language of US Midwest

Ho-Chunk
- Winnebago
- Hoocą́k hoit'éra
- Native to: Midwestern United States
- Region: Wisconsin, Nebraska, Iowa, South Dakota, Illinois, and Minnesota
- Ethnicity: 1,650 Ho-Chunk (2000 census)
- Native speakers: 250 (2007); Mainly older adults
- Language family: Siouan: Western Siouan; Mississippi Valley; Chiwere–Winnebago; Ho-Chunk
- Writing system: Latin (Ho-Chunk alphabet), Great Lakes Algonquian syllabics

Language codes
- ISO 639-3: win
- Glottolog: hoch1243
- ELP: Winnebago
- Linguasphere: 64-AAC-d
- Winnebago is classified as Severely Endangered by the UNESCO Atlas of the World's Languages in Danger.

Ho-Chunk (Hoocąk) "sacred voice"
- Person: Hoocąk
- People: Hoocąkra
- Language: Hoocą́k hoit'éra Nąąp hoit’e
- Country: Hoocąk Waazija

The Ho-Chunk language (Hoocąk, Hocąk), also known as Winnebago, is the language of the Ho-Chunk people of the Ho-Chunk Nation of Wisconsin and Winnebago Tribe of Nebraska. The language is part of the Siouan language family and is closely related to other Chiwere Siouan dialects, including those of the Iowa, Missouria, and Otoe.

"Winnebago", a name now used for the Ho-Chunk who were forcibly removed to Nebraska, is an exonym, an Anglicization of the Sauk and Fox word Oinepegi. The anglicized form of the endonym is "Ho-Chunk".

== Language revitalization ==
Although the language is highly endangered, there are currently vigorous efforts underway to keep it alive in Ho-Chunk communities. In Wisconsin, the Hoocąk Waziija Haci Language Division runs several language classes, an immersion daycare, and a language apprentice program. Some schools teach the language, or have elements of the language in cultural education. In Nebraska, the Ho-Chunk Renaissance program teaches the language in local and reservation schools. Both tribal governments recognize the importance of technology in language learning, and are active in Facebook and YouTube to reach the younger generation of learners. A "Ho-Chunk (Hoocąk) Native American Language app" is available for iPhone, iPad, and other iOS devices. Language is a crucial aspect of Ho-Chunk culture:

"Within a lot of Native American cultures, language and culture go together," Lewis St. Cyr, language program director for the Ho-Chunk, said. "You can't have culture without language and you can't have language without culture. The importance of it is of who we are."

== Phonology ==
=== Phonemic inventory ===
==== Vowels ====
Ho-Chunk's vowel sounds are distinguished by nasality and length. That is to say, the use of a nasal vowel or a long vowel affects a word's meaning. This is evident in examples such as pąą /pãː/ 'bag' compared to paa /paː/ 'nose', and waruc /waˈɾutʃ/ 'to eat' compared to waaruc /waːˈɾutʃ/ 'table'. All of Ho-Chunk's vowels show a length distinction, but only /i a u/ have nasal counterparts.

	Front		Central		Back	
	oral	nasal	oral	nasal	oral	nasal
High	i	ĩ			u	ũ
Mid	e				o	
Low			a	ã		

==== Consonants ====
Ho-Chunk's consonants are listed in the following table:

		Labial	Alveolar	Postalveolar	Palatal	Velar	Glottal
Nasal		m	n				
Plosive/ Affricate	Voiceless	p	t	tʃ		k	ʔ
Plosive/ Affricate	Voiced	b	d	dʒ		g	
Plosive/ Affricate	Ejective	pʼ	tʼ			kʼ	
Fricative	Voiceless		s	ʃ		x	h
Fricative	Voiced		z	ʒ		ɣ	
Fricative	Ejective		sʼ	ʃʼ		xʼ	
Trill			r				
Approximant		w			j	(w)	

Typical of Mississippi Valley Siouan languages, Ho-Chunk has aspirated /p/ and /k/ phonemes but no aspirated /t/.

=== Nasalization patterns ===
In Ho-Chunk, vowels /i a u/ always occur as nasalized when they follow nasal consonants /m n/. Nasality spreads to an adjacent vowel if that vowel is nasalizable as well. Nasality spreads across syllable or word boundaries and can move across consonants /h/ and /w/, but is blocked by all other consonants. Examples include nąįžą /nãĩʒã/ 'a tree' and ha'ųwį /haʔũwĩ/ 'we (exclusive) do':

nąą hižą
tree one
'a tree'

ha- ųų -wi
1.EX.A- do -PL
'We (exclusive) do'

Another frequently occurring nasalization pattern is /r/ to [n] alternation: /r/ is pronounced as [n] when it immediately follows a nasal vowel. That is shown in the definite marker /ra/ on the verb 'have' -nį-, which occurs as [nã] in the sentence 'My knife is dull' below:

Mąąhį ha<ha>nį=ra juujux-šąną
knife <1.EX.A>have=DEF dull-DECL
'My knife is dull'

=== Dorsey's law ===
There is a notable sound law in Ho-Chunk called Dorsey's law which dictates the following:

- /ORS/ → [OSRS]

where O is a voiceless obstruent, R is a resonant, and S a syllabic sound. In other words, if there is an underlying voiceless obstruent (in Ho-Chunk, /p/, /c/, /k/, /s/, /š/, and /x/) followed by resonant (/r/, /n/, or /w/), the vowel following the resonant is copied into the proceeding consonant cluster. All Dorsey's Law sequences attested in the language are listed below, with V representing the copied vowel:

- pVnV
- pVrV
- kVnV
- kVrV
- kVwV
- sVnV
- sVrV
- sVwV
- šVnV
- šVrV
- šVwV
- cVwV
- xVnV
- xVrV
- xVwV

Multiple sources advocate that Dorsey's law is a synchronic process in the language because of the way that other processes like stress assignment and the morphological process of reduplication are affected by it.

Dorsey's law can apply within a single morpheme, as in /pra/ becoming [para] in the word paras '(be) wide, flat', or across morpheme boundaries, as in /šra/ becoming [šara] in the word šaraše 'you go there', where š is the second person pronominal prefixing to the verb rahe 'to be going there'.

=== Metrical structure ===
Ho-Chunk is a mora counting, but syllable accenting language. The stress placement of words spoken in isolation is extremely regular. Single-syllable words always have a long vowel (two moras), and stress falls on the first mora (e.g. áa 'arm'). Two-syllable words have two moras, and primary stress falls on the second mora (e.g. wajé 'dress'). In words longer than two syllables, primary stress most often falls on the third syllable, with secondary stress on each even numbered vowel after the point of primary stress (e.g. waǧįǧį́ 'ball', or hocįcį́k 'boy'). A few rare examples of words with primary stress not on the third syllable include booráxux 'you break something into pieces' and gikąnąhé 'to invite somebody'. These and other exceptions are a result of syllable weight affecting stress location. As seen in booráxux 'you break something into pieces', when one of the first two syllables of a multiple-syllable word is a heavy syllable, then the main stress falls on the second syllable

Generally when words are spoken in sequence to form sentences, each retains its own stress domain. However, when two or more words are compounded, they are treated as a single word and form a new single stress domain in which the aforementioned patterns apply. Examples include hąąbókahi 'every day' (a compound consisting of hąąp 'day' and hokahí 'every') and wąągwácek 'young man' (wąąk 'man' and wacék 'young').

Ho-Chunk's stress system is substantially different from that of other Siouan languages, which have main stress on the second syllable or second mora. It is theorized that Ho-Chunk underwent a stress shift one mora to the right at some point in its history.

== Orthography ==
The official Ho-Chunk orthography derives from an Americanist version of the International Phonetic Alphabet (IPA). As such, its graphemes broadly resemble those of IPA, and there is a close one-to-one correspondence between graphemes and phonemes. The orthography differs from IPA in that the nasal vowels are indicated using an ogonek. Thus, /ĩ/, /ũ/, and /ã/ are written as į, ų, and ą, respectively. In addition, the postalveolar and palatal consonants are written as c, j, š, ž, and y (in IPA: /tʃ/, /dʒ/, /ʃ/, /ʒ/ and /j/), the velar fricative /ɣ/ is written as ǧ, and the glottal stop is written as ʼ .

The diacritic marks can be referred to in Ho-Chunk with the following terms: sįįc 'tail' for the ogonek, wookąnąk 'hat' for the haček, and hiyuša jikere 'sudden start/stop' for the glottal stop.

For a short period of time in the mid to late 1800s, Ho-Chunk was written with an adaptation of the "Ba-Be-Bi-Bo" syllabics system. As of 1994, however, the official alphabet of the Ho-Chunk Nation is an adaptation of the Latin script. The Ho-Chunk Nations of Wisconsin and Nebraska represent some sounds differently in the alphabets that they use, as the Wisconsin tribe write a double vowel to mark longer length, and the Nebraska tribe uses a macron over the vowel (compare oo with ō for IPA /o:/). These differences, shown with example words, are demonstrated in the chart below. In total, the Ho-Chunk writing system consists of 26 consonant and 16 vowel graphs/digraphs.

=== Orthography comparison ===
Ho-Chunk Nation of Wisconsin	Ho-Chunk Nation of Nebraska	IPA	Example word
a		a, ʌ	caš ′tapping sound′
aa	ā	aː	caa / cā ′deer′
ą		ã, ʌ̃	nįįpąną ′soup′
ąą	ą̄	ã:	pąą / pą̄ ′bag′
b		b	boojaš / bōjaš ′marbles′
c		tʃ	caa / cā ′deer′
e		e, ɛ	serec ′(be) long′
ee	ē	eː, ɛː	seep / sēp ′(be) black′
g		g	gaaga / gāga ′grandma′
ǧ		ɣ	ǧaak / ǧāk ′(to) cry′
h		h	Hoocąk / Hōcąk ′Ho-Chunk′
i		i	kirikiriš ′(be) striped′
ii	ī	iː	ciinąk / cīnąk ′village, town′
į		ĩ	hocįcį ′boy′
įį	į̄	ĩ:	pįį / pį̄ ′(be) good′
j		dʒ	jaasge / jāsge ′how′
k		k	keecąk / '''k'ēcąk ′turtle′
kʼ		kʼ	kʼee / kʼē ′(to) dig′
m		m	mįįnąk / mį̄nąk ′(to) sit′
n		n	nįį / nį̄' ′water′
o		o	xoro ′(to) snore′
oo	ō	o:	coo / cō ′(be) blue, green′
p		p	pąą / pą̄ ′bag′
pʼ		pʼ	pʼoopʼoš / pʼōpʼoš ′(be) fluffy′
r		r	roohą / rōhą ′a lot′
s		s	sii / sī ′foot′
sʼ		sʼ	rusʼįsʼį ′(to) shiver, shake′
š		ʃ	šuuc / šūc ′(be) red′
šʼ		ʃʼ	rušʼašʼa ′(to) tickle′
t		t	taanį / tānį ′three′
tʼ		tʼ	tʼąą / tʼą̄' ′(to) fly′
u		u	waruc ′(to) eat, food′
uu	ū	u:	huu / hū ′leg′
ų		ũ	gigųs ′(to) teach′
ųų	ų̄	ũ:	hųųc / hų̄c ′bear′
w		w	waa / wā ′snow′
x		x	xee / xē ′(to) bury, hill′
xʼ		xʼ	xʼooke / xʼōke ′parents′
y		j	iiyaara / īyāra ′(to) yawn′
z		z	zii / zī ′(be) yellow, brown′
ž		ʒ	žuura / žūra ′money, dollar′
ʼ		ʔ	waʼų ′(to) be, do′

== Morphology ==
=== Verb structure ===
Ho-Chunk is an agglutinating and somewhat fusional language. Verbs contain several affixes to indicate things like person, number, tense, and mood.

==== Prefix field ====
Ho-Chunk uses prefixes on a verb stem to mark person, locative case, instrumental case, benefactive case, reflexivity (including possessive reflexivity), and reciprocality.

===== Person prefixes =====
Ho-Chunk verbs are inflected with eight pronominal categories marked for person and clusivity. Ho-Chunk is a pro-drop language; pronouns are used very infrequently, and information on grammatical person is found on the verb in the form of one or more prefixes.

1. First person singular (abbreviated 1SG)
2. Second person singular (abbreviated 2SG)
3. Third person singular (abbreviated 3SG)
4. First person dual inclusive (abbreviated 1IN.DU)
5. First person inclusive plural (abbreviated 1IN.PL)
6. First person exclusive plural (abbreviated 1EX.PL)
7. Second person plural (abbreviated 2PL)
8. Third person plural (abbreviated 3PL)

====== Person marking in transitive verbs ======
Ho-Chunk's transitive verbs are inflected with agent (actor) and patient (undergoer) pronominals. The generic paradigm of the pronominal prefixes in transitive verbs is outlined below. The letter V stands in the place of the verb stem.:

				Patient							
				1st person				2nd person		3rd person	
				singular	dual	plural		singular	plural	singular	plural
				singular	INCL	INCL	EXCL	singular	plural	singular	plural
Actor	1st person	singular						nįį-V	nįį-V-wi	∅-ha-V	wa-ha-V
Actor	1st person	dual	INCL							hį-∅-V	hį-wa-V
Actor	1st person	plural	INCL							hį-∅-V-wi	hį-wa-V-wi
Actor	1st person	plural	EXCL					nįį-V-wi	nįį-V-wi	∅-ha-V-wi	wa-ha-V-wi
Actor	2nd person	singular		hį-ra-V			hį-ra-V-wi			∅-ra-V	wa-ra-V
Actor	2nd person	plural		hį-ra-V-wi			hį-ra-V-wi			∅-ra-V-wi	wa-ra-V-wi
Actor	3rd person	singular		hį-∅-V	wąąga-∅-V	wąąga-∅-V-wi	hį-∅-V-wi	nį-∅-V	nį-∅-V-wi	∅-∅-V	wa-∅-V
Actor	3rd person	plural		hį-V-ire	wąąga-V-ire	wąąga-V-ire-wi	hį-V-ire-wi	nį-V-ire	nį-V-ire-wi	∅-V-ire	wa-V-ire

In this table, the null symbol (∅) is used to represent all third person singular actor and patient pronominals. It indicates that there is no overt prefix for those pronominals (in other words, that they are null morphemes). Some cells are left blank because there are no pronominal affixes associated with that particular person/number combination. In cases like these, the action is reflexive (i.e. I do something to myself, or you (plural) do something to yourselves). Reflexivity in Ho-Chunk is indicated with another prefix, kii-.

The sounds in the prefixes run together in casual speech, often leading to the deletion of the /h/ consonant and thus a long vowel or diphthong. This is evident in the example waakere 'I put them (standing)', in which the third person plural patient prefix wa- merges with the first person actor prefix ha-, producing waa-.

====== Person marking in intransitive verbs ======
Ho-Chunk's intransitive verbs fall into three main types: intransitive active verbs, intransitive stative verbs, and intransitive 'third person-only' verbs.

Intransitive active verbs are those which involve only human or animate agent(s). An example is šgaac 'play', which is inflected for person and number as follows:

Person and number marking paradigm for intransitive action verb šgaac
		Ho-Chunk verb	Translation
Agent	1SG	hašgac (ha-šgac)	'I play'
Agent	2SG	rašgac (ra-šgac)	'you play'
Agent	3SG	šgaac (∅-šgac)	'he or she plays'
Agent	1IN.DU	hįšgac (hį-šgac)	'you and I play'
Agent	1IN.PL	hįšgacwi (hį-šgac-wi)	'we (inclusive) play'
Agent	1EX.PL	hašgacwi (ha-šgac-wi)	'we (exclusive) play'
Agent	2PL	rašgacwi (ra-šgac-wi)	'you (plural) play'
Agent	3PL	šgaacire (šgaac-ire)	'they play'

Intransitive stative verbs involve an action affecting a patient. This is characteristic of the verb š'aak 'to be old':

Person and number marking paradigm for intransitive stative verb š'aak
		Ho-Chunk verb	Translation
Patient	1SG	hįš'ak (hį-š'ak)	'I am old'
Patient	2SG	nįš'ak (nį-š'ak)	'you are old'
Patient	3SG	š'aak (∅-š'aak)	'he or she is old'
Patient	1IN.DU	wąągaš'ak (wąąga-š'ak)	'you and I are old'
Patient	1IN.PL	wąągaš'akwi (wąąga-š'ak-wi)	'we (inclusive) are old'
Patient	1EX.PL	hįš'akwi (hį-š'ak-wi)	'we (exclusive) are old'
Patient	2PL	nįš'akwi (nį-š'ak-wi)	'you (plural) are old'
Patient	3PL	š'aakire (š'aak-ire)	'they are old'

Intransitive third-person-only verbs designate states and properties of mostly inanimate things, such as "(to) be delicious" or "(to) be expensive". They can only be inflected for third person singular or third person plural subjects (e.g. ceexi (∅-ceexi) 'it is expensive' or ceexire (ceexi-ire) 'they are expensive').

===== Locative prefixes =====
Ho-Chunk has two locative prefixes, ha- 'on' or 'onto', and ho- 'in' or 'into'. These prefixes were first described by William Lipkind in his 1928 grammar of the language^{[11]} . The prefixes are added to a verb stem as seen in the examples below:

mįįk → hamįk
{to lie (somewhere)} → {to lie on top of}

mįįk → homįk
{to lie (somewhere)} → {to lie in}

A locative prefix may derive a noun, a verb, or both. This is true for homįk, which can refer to a verb 'to lie in' or a noun 'bed'. More recent learning materials refer to the ha- prefix as a superessive applicative marker, and the ho- prefix as an inessive applicative marker.

===== Instrumental prefixes =====
Ho-Chunk has a set of instrumental prefixes which indicate that an action is accomplished by means of some instrument, force, or special type of instrumental movement. These prefixes are translated into English with such phrases as 'by foot', 'by hand', or 'by striking'. Some sources list eight instrumental prefixes in Ho-Chunk, while others recognize a ninth nąą- 'by internal force' (phonologically identical to nąą- 'by foot'). These prefixes are listed first with their English translation, then paired with a stem wax 'to break, cut or sever a string-like object':

Instrumental prefixes
	Instrumental prefix	English translation
Inner	gi-	'by striking'
Inner	ra-	'with the mouth, with the teeth'
Inner	ru-	'by hand'
Inner	wa-	'by pressure, by pushing'
Outer	boo-	'by shooting, by blowing, by force'
Outer	mąą-	'by cutting'
Outer	nąą(1)-	'by foot'
Outer	nąą(2)-	'by internal force'
Outer	taa-	'by extreme temperature'

Instrumental prefixes paired with stem wax
Ho-Chunk verb	English translation
giwax	'break string in two by striking'
rawax	'bite string in two'
ruwax	'break string in two by pulling'
wawax	'break string by downward pressure'
boowax	'shoot string in two'
mąąwax	'cut string in two'
nąąwax	'break string in two by foot'
nąąwax	'string breaks of own accord'
taawax	'string is burned in two'

The instrumental prefixes are identified as 'Inner' or 'Outer' due to their position relative to other prefixes attaching to the verb stem. Inner prefixes are closer to the verb stem, while outer prefixes are farther away on the left edge of the word. Instrumental prefixes are found in all Siouan languages, and it is theorized that outer instrumentals originated as nouns or nominalized stems.

==== Suffix field ====
Ho-Chunk's suffixes mark number, tense, mood, negation, and aspect.

== Syntax ==
=== Basic word order ===
Like other Siouan languages, Ho-Chunk's basic word order is Subject–Object–Verb (SOV).An example of a typical sentence is Hinųkra wažątirehižą ruwį 'The woman bought a car.' In a sentence with two objects, such as Hinųkiža hocįcįhižą wiiwagaxhižą hok'ų 'A girl gave a boy a pencil', the canonical word order is Subject-Indirect Object-Direct Object-Verb. Word order is relatively free in Ho-Chunk; however, while a word order such as Wažątirehižą, hinųkra ruwį 'The woman bought a car' is permissible, the change from the basic neutral word order of SOV requires a prosodic pause indicated by a comma. Without this pause, an interpretation 'A car bought the woman' is possible, though highly unlikely.

=== Negation ===
Negative phrases are expressed with a particle, such as hąąke 'not' or hąkaga 'never' paired with the suffix/enclitic -nį 'not'. Both elements are required in such phrases: the particle precedes the verb phrase, while -nį is suffixed to the verb. The following examples demonstrate this construction:

wąąk-ra heepšį-nį
man-the sneeze-NEG
'The man did not sneeze.'

hąkaga waką t'ee-haa-nį wa'ų-ha-jee
never snake die-1.cause-NEG aux-1SG-POS.VERB
'I never kill snakes.'
