= Ẽ =

Latin letter E with tilde

Ẽ, ẽ is a letter in which the tilde indicates a nasal vowel or nasal consonant.

== Usage ==
In the International Phonetic Alphabet, ⟨ẽ⟩ represents a nasalized [e] sound. It is the 5th letter in the Guaraní alphabet and widely used in other Amerindian languages in Brazil, such as Kaingang, representing this nasalized [ẽ] sound. It is also used for the Bantu language Umbundu.

In Romagnol, ⟨ẽ⟩ has been proposed to represent [ẽː], e.g. galẽna [gaˈlẽːna] ("hen").

In Vietnamese, it is used to represent an E with a ngã tone.

Commonly found in medieval and Renaissance-era texts, both in Latin and vernacular languages such as Old Spanish and Middle French, standing for en and em before a consonant or at the end of a word. For example, Old Spanish tiẽpo for tiempo, riẽdas for riendas, fazẽ for fazen.

In older Italian documents, a tilde is used to indicate a missing m after a vowel. So, ⟨ẽ⟩ is used to abbreviate em, as in tẽpo instead of tempo

== Computer encoding ==
Character information
Preview	Ẽ		ẽ	
Unicode name	LATIN CAPITAL LETTER E WITH TILDE		LATIN SMALL LETTER E WITH TILDE	
Encodings	decimal	hex	dec	hex
Unicode	7868	U+1EBC	7869	U+1EBD
UTF-8	225 186 188	E1 BA BC	225 186 189	E1 BA BD
Numeric character reference	&#7868;	&#x1EBC;	&#7869;	&#x1EBD;
