= Combining Diacritical Marks =

- Range: U+0300..U+036F (112 code points)
- Plane: BMP
- Scripts: Inherited
- Major alphabets: IPA, UPA
- Symbol sets: accents diacritics
- Assigned: 112 code points
- Unused: 0 reserved code points

Unicode version history
- 1.0.0 (1991): 66 (+66)
- 1.0.1 (1992): 68 (+2)
- 1.1 (1993): 72 (+4)
- 3.0 (1999): 82 (+10)
- 3.2 (2002): 96 (+14)
- 4.0 (2003): 107 (+11)
- 4.1 (2005): 112 (+5)

Unicode documentation
- Code chart ∣ Web page
- Note: Two characters were moved from the Greek and Coptic block to the Combining Diacritical Marks block in version 1.0.1 during the process of unifying with ISO 10646.

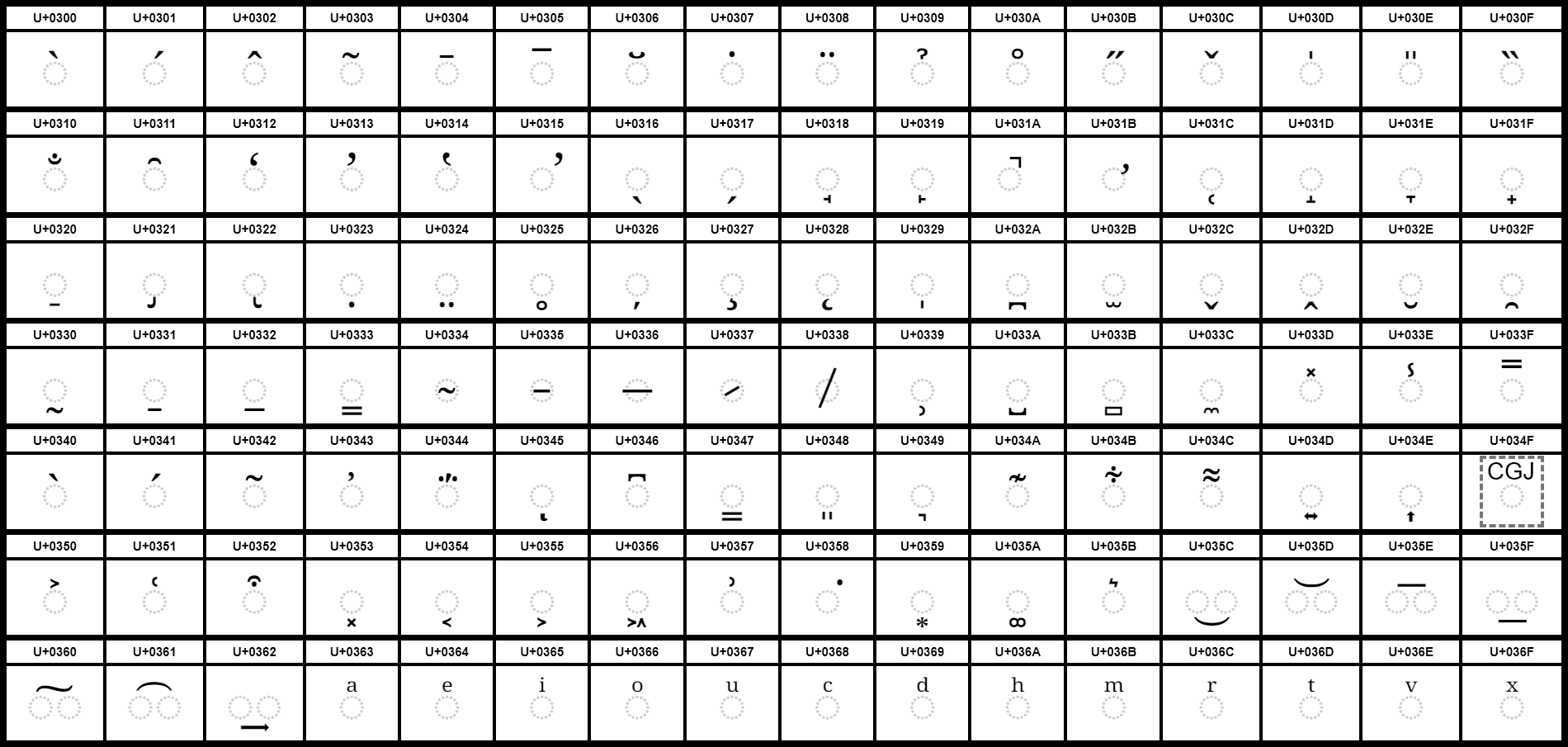
Graphical representation of the Combining Diacritical Marks Unicode block. Hatched boxes indicate non-assigned code points.

Combining Diacritical Marks is a Unicode block containing the most common combining characters. It also contains the character "Combining Grapheme Joiner", which prevents canonical reordering of combining characters, and despite the name, actually separates characters that would otherwise be considered a single grapheme in a given context. Its block name in Unicode 1.0 was Generic Diacritical Marks.

== Block ==
Combining Diacritical Marks^{[1]} Official Unicode Consortium code chart (PDF)
| | 0 | 1 | 2 | 3 | 4 | 5 | 6 | 7 | 8 | 9 | A | B | C | D | E | F |
| U+030x | ◌̀ | ◌́ | ◌̂ | ◌̃ | ◌̄ | ◌̅ | ◌̆ | ◌̇ | ◌̈ | ◌̉ | ◌̊ | ◌̋ | ◌̌ | ◌̍ | ◌̎ | ◌̏ |
| U+031x | ◌̐ | ◌̑ | ◌̒ | ◌̓ | ◌̔ | ◌̕ | ◌̖ | ◌̗ | ◌̘ | ◌̙ | ◌̚ | ◌̛ | ◌̜ | ◌̝ | ◌̞ | ◌̟ |
| U+032x | ◌̠ | ◌̡ | ◌̢ | ◌̣ | ◌̤ | ◌̥ | ◌̦ | ◌̧ | ◌̨ | ◌̩ | ◌̪ | ◌̫ | ◌̬ | ◌̭ | ◌̮ | ◌̯ |
| U+033x | ◌̰ | ◌̱ | ◌̲ | ◌̳ | ◌̴ | ◌̵ | ◌̶ | ◌̷ | ◌̸ | ◌̹ | ◌̺ | ◌̻ | ◌̼ | ◌̽ | ◌̾ | ◌̿ |
| U+034x | ◌̀ | ◌́ | ◌͂ | ◌̓ | ◌̈́ | ◌ͅ | ◌͆ | ◌͇ | ◌͈ | ◌͉ | ◌͊ | ◌͋ | ◌͌ | ◌͍ | ◌͎ | CGJ |
| U+035x | ◌͐ | ◌͑ | ◌͒ | ◌͓ | ◌͔ | ◌͕ | ◌͖ | ◌͗ | ◌͘ | ◌͙ | ◌͚ | ◌͛ | ◌͜◌ | ◌͝◌ | ◌͞◌ | ◌͟◌ |
| U+036x | ◌͠◌ | ◌͡◌ | ◌͢◌ | ◌ͣ | ◌ͤ | ◌ͥ | ◌ͦ | ◌ͧ | ◌ͨ | ◌ͩ | ◌ͪ | ◌ͫ | ◌ͬ | ◌ͭ | ◌ͮ | ◌ͯ |
Notes 1.As of Unicode version 17.0

== Character table ==
| Code | Representative glyph | Decimal | Description |
|---|---|---|---|
| U+0300 | ̀ | 768 | Combining Grave Accent |
| U+0301 | ́ | 769 | Combining Acute Accent |
| U+0302 | ̂ | 770 | Combining Circumflex Accent |
| U+0303 | ̃ | 771 | Combining Tilde |
| U+0304 | ̄ | 772 | Combining Macron |
| U+0305 | ̅ | 773 | Combining Overline |
| U+0306 | ̆ | 774 | Combining Breve |
| U+0307 | ̇ | 775 | Combining Dot Above |
| U+0308 | ̈ | 776 | Combining Diaeresis |
| U+0309 | ̉ | 777 | Combining Hook Above |
| U+030A | ̊ | 778 | Combining Ring Above |
| U+030B | ̋ | 779 | Combining Double Acute Accent |
| U+030C | ̌ | 780 | Combining Caron |
| U+030D | ̍ | 781 | Combining Vertical Line Above |
| U+030E | ̎ | 782 | Combining Double Vertical Line Above |
| U+030F | ̏ | 783 | Combining Double Grave Accent |
| U+0310 | ̐ | 784 | Combining Candrabindu |
| U+0311 | ̑ | 785 | Combining Inverted Breve |
| U+0312 | ̒ | 786 | Combining Turned Comma Above |
| U+0313 | ̓ | 787 | Combining Comma Above |
| U+0314 | ̔ | 788 | Combining Reversed Comma Above |
| U+0315 | ̕ | 789 | Combining Comma Above Right |
| U+0316 | ̖ | 790 | Combining Grave Accent Below |
| U+0317 | ̗ | 791 | Combining Acute Accent Below |
| U+0318 | ̘ | 792 | Combining Left Tack Below |
| U+0319 | ̙ | 793 | Combining Right Tack Below |
| U+031A | ̚ | 794 | Combining Left Angle Above |
| U+031B | ̛ | 795 | Combining Horn |
| U+031C | ̜ | 796 | Combining Left Half Ring Below |
| U+031D | ̝ | 797 | Combining Up Tack Below |
| U+031E | ̞ | 798 | Combining Down Tack Below |
| U+031F | ̟ | 799 | Combining Plus Sign Below |
| U+0320 | ̠ | 800 | Combining Minus Sign Below |
| U+0321 | ̡ | 801 | Combining Palatalized Hook Below |
| U+0322 | ̢ | 802 | Combining Retroflex Hook Below |
| U+0323 | ̣ | 803 | Combining Dot Below |
| U+0324 | ̤ | 804 | Combining Diaeresis Below |
| U+0325 | ̥ | 805 | Combining Ring Below |
| U+0326 | ̦ | 806 | Combining Comma Below |
| U+0327 | ̧ | 807 | Combining Cedilla |
| U+0328 | ̨ | 808 | Combining Ogonek |
| U+0329 | ̩ | 809 | Combining Vertical Line Below |
| U+032A | ̪ | 810 | Combining Bridge Below |
| U+032B | ̫ | 811 | Combining Inverted Double Arch Below |
| U+032C | ̬ | 812 | Combining Caron Below |
| U+032D | ̭ | 813 | Combining Circumflex Accent Below |
| U+032E | ̮ | 814 | Combining Breve Below |
| U+032F | ̯ | 815 | Combining Inverted Breve Below |
| U+0330 | ̰ | 816 | Combining Tilde Below |
| U+0331 | ̱ | 817 | Combining Macron Below |
| U+0332 | ̲ | 818 | Combining Low Line |
| U+0333 | ̳ | 819 | Combining Double Low Line |
| U+0334 | ̴ | 820 | Combining Tilde Overlay |
| U+0335 | ̵ | 821 | Combining Short Stroke Overlay |
| U+0336 | ̶ | 822 | Combining Long Stroke Overlay |
| U+0337 | ̷ | 823 | Combining Short Solidus Overlay |
| U+0338 | ̸ | 824 | Combining Long Solidus Overlay |
| U+0339 | ̹ | 825 | Combining Right Half Ring Below |
| U+033A | ̺ | 826 | Combining Inverted Bridge Below |
| U+033B | ̻ | 827 | Combining Square Below |
| U+033C | ̼ | 828 | Combining Seagull Below |
| U+033D | ̽ | 829 | Combining X Above |
| U+033E | ̾ | 830 | Combining Vertical Tilde |
| U+033F | ̿ | 831 | Combining Double Overline |
| U+0340 | ̀ | 832 | Combining Grave Tone Mark |
| U+0341 | ́ | 833 | Combining Acute Tone Mark |
| U+0342 | ͂ | 834 | Combining Greek Perispomeni |
| U+0343 | ̓ | 835 | Combining Greek Koronis |
| U+0344 | ̈́ | 836 | Combining Greek Dialytika Tonos |
| U+0345 | ͅ | 837 | Combining Greek Ypogegrammeni |
| U+0346 | ͆ | 838 | Combining Bridge Above |
| U+0347 | ͇ | 839 | Combining Equals Sign Below |
| U+0348 | ͈ | 840 | Combining Double Vertical Line Below |
| U+0349 | ͉ | 841 | Combining Left Angle Below |
| U+034A | ͊ | 842 | Combining Not Tilde Above |
| U+034B | ͋ | 843 | Combining Homothetic Above |
| U+034C | ͌ | 844 | Combining Almost Equal To Above |
| U+034D | ͍ | 845 | Combining Left Right Arrow Below |
| U+034E | ͎ | 846 | Combining Upwards Arrow Below |
| U+034F | ͏ | 847 | Combining Grapheme Joiner |
| U+0350 | ͐ | 848 | Combining Right Arrowhead Above |
| U+0351 | ͑ | 849 | Combining Left Half Ring Above |
| U+0352 | ͒ | 850 | Combining Fermata |
| U+0353 | ͓ | 851 | Combining X Below |
| U+0354 | ͔ | 852 | Combining Left Arrowhead Below |
| U+0355 | ͕ | 853 | Combining Right Arrowhead Below |
| U+0356 | ͖ | 854 | Combining Right Arrowhead And Up Arrowhead Below |
| U+0357 | ͗ | 855 | Combining Right Half Ring Above |
| U+0358 | ͘ | 856 | Combining Dot Above Right See also: O͘ |
| U+0359 | ͙ | 857 | Combining Asterisk Below |
| U+035A | ͚ | 858 | Combining Double Ring Below |
| U+035B | ͛ | 859 | Combining Zigzag Above |
| U+035C | ͜ | 860 | Combining Double Breve Below |
| U+035D | ͝ | 861 | Combining Double Breve |
| U+035E | ͞ | 862 | Combining Double Macron |
| U+035F | ͟ | 863 | Combining Double Macron Below |
| U+0360 | ͠ | 864 | Combining Double Tilde |
| U+0361 | ͡ | 865 | Combining Double Inverted Breve |
| U+0362 | ͢ | 866 | Combining Double Rightwards Arrow Below |
| U+0363 | ͣ | 867 | Combining Latin Small Letter A |
| U+0364 | ͤ | 868 | Combining Latin Small Letter E |
| U+0365 | ͥ | 869 | Combining Latin Small Letter I |
| U+0366 | ͦ | 870 | Combining Latin Small Letter O |
| U+0367 | ͧ | 871 | Combining Latin Small Letter U |
| U+0368 | ͨ | 872 | Combining Latin Small Letter C |
| U+0369 | ͩ | 873 | Combining Latin Small Letter D |
| U+036A | ͪ | 874 | Combining Latin Small Letter H |
| U+036B | ͫ | 875 | Combining Latin Small Letter M |
| U+036C | ͬ | 876 | Combining Latin Small Letter R |
| U+036D | ͭ | 877 | Combining Latin Small Letter T |
| U+036E | ͮ | 878 | Combining Latin Small Letter V |
| U+036F | ͯ | 879 | Combining Latin Small Letter X |

== History ==
The following Unicode-related documents record the purpose and process of defining specific characters in the Combining Diacritical Marks block:

| Version | Final code points (Note: Proposed code points and characters names may differ from final code points and names) | Count | UTC ID | L2 ID | WG2 ID | Document |
|---|---|---|---|---|---|---|
| 1.0.0 | U+0300..0341 | 66 | | | | (to be determined) |
| 1.0.0 | U+0300..0341 | 66 | | | N3153 (pdf, doc) | Umamaheswaran, V. S. (2007-02-16), "m49.1g", Unconfirmed minutes of WG 2 meeting 49 AIST, Akihabara, Tokyo, Japan; 2006-09-25/29, "Correct the glyphs for 0340 COMBINING GRAVE TONE MARK and 0341 COMBINING ACUTE TONE MARK to be the same as their canonical equivalent characters at 0300 and 0301 respectively." |
| 1.0.0 | U+0300..0341 | 66 | | | N3353 (pdf, doc) | Umamaheswaran, V. S. (2007-10-10), "M51.3c", Unconfirmed minutes of WG 2 meeting 51 Hanzhou, China; 2007-04-24/27, "Correction to the glyphs for 0333 and 0347" |
| 1.0.0 | U+0300..0341 | 66 | | L2/08-287 | | Davis, Mark (2008-08-04), Public Review Issue #122: Proposal for Additional Deprecated Characters |
| 1.0.0 | U+0300..0341 | 66 | | L2/08-253R2 | | Moore, Lisa (2008-08-19), "Consensus 116-C13", UTC #116 Minutes, "Change the deprecated property by removing 0340, 0341, 17D3, and adding 0149, 0F77, 0F79, 17A4, 2329, 232A." |
| 1.0.0 | U+0300..0341 | 66 | | L2/16-178 | | Evans, Lorna; Keating, Patricia (2016-07-06), Representative glyph and annotation additions for U+033B |
| 1.0.0 | U+0300..0341 | 66 | | L2/16-216 | | Anderson, Deborah; Whistler, Ken; McGowan, Rick; Pournader, Roozbeh; Glass, Andrew; Iancu, Laurențiu; Moore, Lisa (2016-07-30), "18. Combining Diacritical Marks", Recommendations to UTC #148 August 2016 on Script Proposals |
| 1.0.0 | U+0300..0341 | 66 | | L2/16-203 | | Moore, Lisa (2016-08-18), "Consensus 148-C3", UTC #148 Minutes, "Change the glyph for U+033B COMBINING SQUARE BELOW to a horizontal rectangle as documented in L2/16-178." |
| 1.0.1 | U+0344..0345 | 2 | | | | (to be determined) |
| 1.0.1 | U+0344..0345 | 2 | UTC/1999-017 | | | Davis, Mark (1999-06-02), Data cross-checks (for Agenda) |
| 1.0.1 | U+0344..0345 | 2 | | L2/99-176R | | Moore, Lisa (1999-11-04), "Data Cross-Checks", Minutes from the joint UTC/L2 meeting in Seattle, June 8-10, 1999 |
| 1.0.1 | U+0344..0345 | 2 | | L2/07-068 | | Muller, Eric (2007-02-05), Representation of Greek mute iota |
| 1.0.1 | U+0344..0345 | 2 | | L2/07-015 | | Moore, Lisa (2007-02-08), "Action item 110-A37", UTC #110 Minutes, "Create an FAQ on the Greek mute iota representation and casing issues." |
| 1.0.1 | U+0344..0345 | 2 | | L2/07-198 | | Hudson, John (2007-06-01), Representation of Greek mute iota (response to L2/07-068) |
| 1.0.1 | U+0344..0345 | 2 | | L2/07-263 | | Anderson, Deborah (2007-08-07), Input on Greek Mute Iota |
| 1.1 | U+0342..0343, 0360..0361 | 4 | | | | (to be determined) |
| 3.0 | U+0346..034E, 0362 | 10 | | L2/98-299 | N1845 | Everson, Michael (1998-09-08), Additional IPA "disturbed speech" characters for the UCS |
| 3.0 | U+0346..034E, 0362 | 10 | | L2/98-372 | N1884R2 (pdf, doc) | Whistler, Ken; et al. (1998-09-22), Additional Characters for the UCS |
| 3.0 | U+0346..034E, 0362 | 10 | | L2/98-329 | N1920 | Combined PDAM registration and consideration ballot on WD for ISO/IEC 10646-1/Amd. 30, AMENDMENT 30: Additional Latin and other characters, 1998-10-28 |
| 3.2 | U+034F | 1 | | L2/00-274 | N2236 | Davis, Mark (2000-08-09), Proposal for addition of COMBINING GRAPHEME JOINER |
| 3.2 | U+034F | 1 | | L2/00-187 | | Moore, Lisa (2000-08-23), "Grapheme Joiner", UTC minutes -- Boston, August 8-11, 2000 |
| 3.2 | U+034F | 1 | | L2/01-042 | N2317 | Everson, Michael (2001-01-19), On the use of JOINERS in ligation |
| 3.2 | U+034F | 1 | | L2/01-050 | N2253 | Umamaheswaran, V. S. (2001-01-21), "7.8 Proposal for addition of COMBINING GRAPHEME JOINER", Minutes of the SC2/WG2 meeting in Athens, September 2000 |
| 3.2 | U+034F | 1 | | L2/00-324 | | Moore, Lisa (2001-01-29), "Motion 85-M13", Minutes from UTC #85, San Diego |
| 3.2 | U+034F | 1 | | L2/01-344 | N2353 (pdf, doc) | Umamaheswaran, V. S. (2001-09-09), "7.14", Minutes from SC2/WG2 meeting #40 -- Mountain View, April 2001 |
| 3.2 | U+034F | 1 | | L2/05-094 | | Hallissy, Bob; Priest, Lorna (2005-04-18), Use of CGJ in Latin script diacritics |
| 3.2 | U+034F | 1 | | L2/05-108R | | Moore, Lisa (2005-08-26), "C.7", UTC #103 Minutes |
| 3.2 | U+0363..036F | 13 | | L2/00-061 | N2160 | Küster, Mark (2000-02-02), Proposal concerning combining diacritics for medievalistics [for Middle High German] |
| 3.2 | U+0363..036F | 13 | | L2/00-330 | N2266 | Küster, Marc; Wojtovicz, Isabel (2000-09-14), Diacritics for medieval studies |
| 3.2 | U+0363..036F | 13 | | L2/01-050 | N2253 | Umamaheswaran, V. S. (2001-01-21), "7.17 Diacritics for Medieval Studies", Minutes of the SC2/WG2 meeting in Athens, September 2000 |
| 4.0 | U+0350..0357 | 8 | | L2/02-141 | N2419 | Everson, Michael; et al. (2002-03-20), Uralic Phonetic Alphabet characters for the UCS |
| 4.0 | U+0350..0357 | 8 | | L2/02-192 | | Everson, Michael (2002-05-02), Everson's Reply on UPA |
| 4.0 | U+0350..0357 | 8 | | | N2442 | Everson, Michael; Kolehmainen, Erkki I.; Ruppel, Klaas; Trosterud, Trond (2002-05-21), Justification for placing the Uralic Phonetic Alphabet in the BMP |
| 4.0 | U+0350..0357 | 8 | | L2/02-291 | | Whistler, Ken (2002-05-31), WG2 report from Dublin |
| 4.0 | U+0350..0357 | 8 | | L2/02-292 | | Whistler, Ken (2002-06-03), Early look at WG2 consent docket |
| 4.0 | U+0350..0357 | 8 | | L2/02-166R2 | | Moore, Lisa (2002-08-09), "Scripts and New Characters - UPA", UTC #91 Minutes |
| 4.0 | U+0350..0357 | 8 | | L2/02-253 | | Moore, Lisa (2002-10-21), "Consensus 92-C2", UTC #92 Minutes |
| 4.0 | U+035D..035F | 3 | | L2/02-176 | | Whistler, Ken (2002-03-07), How to make "oo" with combining breve/macron over pair? |
| 4.0 | U+035D..035F | 3 | | L2/02-204 | N2457 | Additional Double Diacritics, 2002-05-10 |
| 4.0 | U+035D..035F | 3 | | L2/02-166R2 | | Moore, Lisa (2002-08-09), "Combining Breve/macron over the oo Pair", UTC #91 Minutes |
| 4.0 | U+035D..035F | 3 | | L2/02-367 | | Constable, Peter (2002-10-30), Double Combining Breve Below, Double Combining Macron |
| 4.0 | U+035D..035F | 3 | | L2/03-142R | N2594 | McGowan, Rick; Constable, Peter; Whistler, Ken (2003-07-01), Proposal to encode combining double breve below |
| 4.1 | U+0358 | 1 | | L2/97-148 | N1593 | Everson, Michael (1997-05-27), Proposal to add Latin characters by Latinized Taiwanese languages |
| 4.1 | U+0358 | 1 | | L2/97-288 | N1603 | Umamaheswaran, V. S. (1997-10-24), "8.24.8", Unconfirmed Meeting Minutes, WG 2 Meeting # 33, Heraklion, Crete, Greece, 20 June – 4 July 1997 |
| 4.1 | U+0358 | 1 | | L2/98-089 | N1712R | Comments on proposal to add Latin characters to Latinized Taiwanese languages, 1998-03-18 |
| 4.1 | U+0358 | 1 | | L2/98-286 | N1703 | Umamaheswaran, V. S.; Ksar, Mike (1998-07-02), "8.26", Unconfirmed Meeting Minutes, WG 2 Meeting #34, Redmond, WA, USA; 1998-03-16--20 |
| 4.1 | U+0358 | 1 | | L2/02-348 | N2507 | Draft of Proposal to add Latin characters required by Latinized Taiwanese Holo language to ISO/IEC 10646, 2002-03-31 |
| 4.1 | U+0358 | 1 | | L2/03-317 | N2626 | Proposal on IPA Extensions & Combining Diacritical Marks for ISO/IEC 10646 in BMP, 2003-09-27 |
| 4.1 | U+0358 | 1 | | L2/03-318 | N2628 | Proposal to add Combining Right Dot Above as required by Taiwanese Holo language Romanization to ISO/IEC 10646, 2003-09-29 |
| 4.1 | U+0358 | 1 | | L2/03-339 | N2646 | Constable, Peter (2003-10-08), Comments on N2626, Proposal on IPA Extensions and Combining Diacritic Marks for ISO/IEC 10646 in BMP |
| 4.1 | U+0358 | 1 | | L2/03-369 | N2669 | Comments on "Combining dot above", 2003-10-20 |
| 4.1 | U+0358 | 1 | | L2/04-076 | N2699 | Tai, Kaihsu; Chen, Pochung; Tan-Tenn, Henry (2003-10-20), Response to WG2-N2669 |
| 4.1 | U+0358 | 1 | | L2/03-372 | N2673 | Anderson, Deborah (2003-10-22), Comments on N2626, "Proposal on IPA Extensions & Combining Diacritic Marks for ISO 10646 in BMP" |
| 4.1 | U+0358 | 1 | | L2/04-107 | N2713 | Revised Proposal for encoding A Supplemented Set of IPA Combining Marks, Modifier Letters & Five-Degree Contour Tone Marks, 2004-03-20 |
| 4.1 | U+0358 | 1 | | L2/04-200 | N2770R | Tai, Kaihsu; Chen, Pochung; Tan-Tenn, Henry (2004-05-29), Response to WG2-N2713 - Combining right dot above |
| 4.1 | U+0359 | 1 | | L2/03-157 | | Pantelia, Maria (2003-05-19), Additional Beta Code Characters not in Unicode (WIP) |
| 4.1 | U+0359 | 1 | | L2/03-186R | N2612-4 | Pantelia, Maria (2003-06-11), Proposal to encode one additional combining diacritic in the UCS |
| 4.1 | U+035A | 1 | | L2/02-364 | N2630 | Glass, Andrew; Baums, Stefan; Salomon, Richard (2003-09-29), Proposal to add one combining diacritic to the UCS |
| 4.1 | U+035B | 1 | | L2/03-219 | N2597 | Proposal to encode one combining character in the UCS, 2003-06-25 |
| 4.1 | U+035C | 1 | | L2/02-031 | | Anderson, Deborah (2002-01-21), TLG Miscellanea Proposal |
| 4.1 | U+035C | 1 | | L2/02-033 | | Anderson, Deborah (2002-01-21), TLG Unicode Proposal (draft) |
| 4.1 | U+035C | 1 | | L2/02-053 | | Anderson, Deborah (2002-02-04), Description of TLG Documents |
| 4.1 | U+035C | 1 | | L2/02-273 | | Pantelia, Maria (2002-07-31), TLG Unicode Proposal |
| 4.1 | U+035C | 1 | | L2/02-287 | | Pantelia, Maria (2002-08-09), Proposal Summary Form accompanying TLG Unicode Proposal (L2/02-273) |
| 4.1 | U+035C | 1 | | L2/02-312R | | Pantelia, Maria (2002-11-07), Proposal to encode additional Greek editorial and punctuation characters in the UCS |
| 4.1 | U+035C | 1 | | L2/03-324 | N2642 | Pantelia, Maria (2003-10-06), Proposal to encode additional Greek editorial and punctuation characters in the UCS |

== See also ==
- Phonetic symbols in Unicode
