= Ė =

Latin letter E, with dot above

Majuscule and minuscule ė.

Ė ė is a letter of the Latin script, the letter E with a dot above.

== Use ==
It is the 9th letter in the Lithuanian alphabet and is also used in the Potawatomi language and the Cheyenne language.

It was coined by Daniel Klein, the author of the first printed grammar of the Lithuanian language, Grammatica Litvanica (1653).

Its pronunciation in Lithuanian is [eː], contrasting with ę, which is pronounced a lower [ɛː] (formerly nasalized [ɛ̃ː]) and e, pronounced [ɛ, ɛː].

The character is also used in Croatian to denote the old yat, alongside the more usual ě.

=== Transliteration ===
This character is also used in strict Library of Congress transliteration in transliterating the Cyrillic letter Э э into the Latin alphabet.

== Computing codes ==
Character information
Preview	Ė		ė	
Unicode name	LATIN CAPITAL LETTER E WITH DOT ABOVE		LATIN SMALL LETTER E WITH DOT ABOVE	
Encodings	decimal	hex	dec	hex
Unicode	278	U+0116	279	U+0117
UTF-8	196 150	C4 96	196 151	C4 97
Numeric character reference	&#278;	&#x116;	&#279;	&#x117;
Named character reference	&Edot;		&edot;	
ISO 8859-13, Windows-1257	203	CB	235	EB

== See also ==
- Dot (diacritic)
