= Ą =

Latin letter A with ogonek

A with ogonek
- Ą ą

Usage
- Writing system: Latin script
- Type: alphabetic
- Sound values: [ɔ]; [ɔŋ]; [ɔw̃]; [ɔn̪]; [ɔm]; [ɔj̃]; [aː]; [ã]

Ą (minuscule: ą) is a letter in the Polish, Kashubian, Lithuanian, Creek, Navajo, Western Apache, Chiricahua, Osage, Hocąk, Mescalero, Gwich'in, Tutchone, and Elfdalian alphabets. It is also used for reconstructing Proto-Germanic (e.g., for representing the ending of a- stem neuter nouns).

It is formed from the letter a and an ogonek ("little tail") and usually, except in modern Lithuanian and Polish, denotes a nasal a sound.

== Polish ==
In the Polish alphabet, ą comes after a, but never appears at the beginning of a word. Originally, ą used to represent a nasal a sound, but in modern times, its pronunciation has shifted to a nasal o sound. The letter does not have one determined pronunciation and instead, its pronunciation is dependent on the sounds that follow it.

=== Pronunciation ===
Pronunciation of ą depending on its position
Position	Pronunciation		Example		
Position	Phonemic	Phonetic	Orthography	Pronunciation (phonemic)	Pronunciation (phonetic)
ą + f, w, s, z, sz, ż, rz, h, ch; word-finally	/ɔŋ/	[ɔw̃]	są ('they are')	/sɔŋ/	[sɔw̃]
ą + k, g	/ɔŋ/	[ɔŋ]	mąka ('flour')	/ˈmɔŋka/	[ˈmɔŋka]
ą + t, d, c, dz, cz, dż	/ɔn/	[ɔn̪]	błąd ('error')	/bwɔnt/	[bwɔn̪t̪]
ą + p, b	/ɔm/	[ɔm]	ząb ('tooth')	/zɔmp/	[zɔmp]
ą + ś, ź, ć, dź, si, zi, ci, dzi	/ɔɲ/	[ɔj̃]	bądź (imperative 'be')	/bɔɲt͡ɕ/	[bɔj̃t͡ɕ]
ą + l, ł	/ɔ/	[ɔ]	wziął ('he took')	/vʑɔw/	[vʑɔw]

In some dialects, word-final ą is also pronounced as /ɔm/; thus, robią is occasionally pronounced as [ˈrɔbjɔm].

=== History ===
Polish ą sound (phoneme) evolved from a long nasal a sound of medieval Polish into a short nasal o sound in the modern language. The medieval vowel, along with its short counterpart, evolved in turn from the merged nasal *ę and *ǫ of Late Proto-Slavic.

Evolution
Early Proto-Slavic	*em/*en/*im/*in and *am/*an/*um/*un
Late Proto-Slavic	/ẽ/ and /õ/, transcribed ⟨ę⟩ and ⟨ǫ⟩
Medieval Polish	short and long /ã/, sometimes written approx. ⟨ø⟩
Modern Polish	short /ã/ → /ɛŋ/, /ɛn/, /ɛm/…, written ⟨ę⟩ long /ã/ → /ɔŋ/, /ɔn/, /ɔm/…, written ⟨ą⟩

The problem remained how to write this nasal sound (phoneme) with the use of Latin letters. First, the Old Czech-style orthography of the Latin alphabet was adopted for writing Polish at the turn of the 16th century. In one of the oldest Polish language manuscripts Przemyśl Meditation ą was written with a dash not with ogonek (tail). This writing method continued until end of 17th century.

In Poland-Lithuania, Latin still dominated in writing in the Kingdom of Poland, and the Cyrillic-based vernacular of Ruthenian had been in official use in the Grand Duchy of Lithuania since the 13th century. In pronunciation, the Church Cyrillic letter big yus (Ѫ ѫ) corresponds to the pronunciation of the Polish ą. However, it is little yus (Ѧ ѧ), which is phonetically similar to ę and, more importantly, shares visual resemblances with the Latin alphabet initial letter (A, a) plus an ogonek, that some believe led to ogonek's introduction. This, according to proponents of the theory, resulted in the letter ą for denoting the nasal o, when it logically should have been ǫ rather than ą. When the ogonek had already been in place as the diacritic for marking nasality in vowels, it was appended to e, resulting in ę for nasal e.

=== Alternations ===
The letter often alternates with ę.

- 'tooth': ząb → zęby ('teeth'),
- 'snake': wąż → węże ('snakes')
- 'husband' in nominative: mąż → z mężem ('with husband', in instrumental case)
- 'weight': ciężar → ciążyć ('to weigh down, to be a burden'),
- 'month': miesiąc → miesięczny ('monthly'),
- 'judge': sędzia → sądzić ('to judge, think')
- 'row' in nominative: rząd → cztery razy z rzędu ('four times in a row', genitive case)

However, in words derived from rząd ('government'), the vowel does not change. Thus, rządu (genitive of rząd) retains the ą, e.g., rozporządzenie rządu ('government's ordinance').

== Lithuanian ==
In modern Lithuanian, it is no longer nasal and is now pronounced as a long a. It is the second letter of the Lithuanian alphabet called a nosinė (nasal a).

The letter is most often found at the end of the noun to construct an ending of accusative case, as in aslą [aːslaː], the accusative of asla (ground, floor); both a and ą in aslą are pronounced [aː] (a long a). Thus, ą is used to distinguish between the transcription of accusative and the nominative cases of the noun asla.

It is also used when converting present tense verbs into participles, e.g., (matąs (somebody who is seeing (matyti) right now).

Nasal an forms are now pronounced [aː], as in sąrašas (list) and san-grąža (turnover, return).

In most cases if a nasal vowel, such as ą, ę, į, ų, appear in the root of an infinitive verb it becomes nasalized, as in kąsti - kanda, kęsti - kenčia, įlįsti - įlindo, skųsti - skundžią.

In some cases, ą, ę and į (but never ė) may be used in different forms, as in tąsa (extension) – tęsia (extends) – tįsoti (to lie extended). Finally, some verbs have it in the middle of a word but only in the present tense, e.g., (bąla (is getting white), but not pabalo (has become white).

The letter can also be found at the beginning of several words, e.g., ąsotis [aːsoːtis] (jug).

== The Americas ==
The ogonek in European languages is attached to the right leg of A. Sometimes, in Native American languages, it is under the middle of A.

In some indigenous languages of the Americas, the letter denotes a nasal a sound:

- Western Apache
- Chiricahua
- Creek
- Gwich'in
- Hochunk
- Mescalero
- Navajo
- Tutchone
- Assiniboine/Nakoda

== Elfdalian ==
The Elfdalian alphabet contains the letters that occur in the Swedish alphabet as well as various letters with ogonek to denote nasality. Ą and ą denote a nasal a sound.

== Reconstructed language ==
Scholars who have reconstructed the Proto-Germanic language (the ancestor of all modern Germanic languages, spoken c. 500 BC – AD 500) use the letter ą to denote a nasal vowel.

== Computing codes ==
Character information
Preview	Ą		ą	
Unicode name	LATIN CAPITAL LETTER A WITH OGONEK		LATIN SMALL LETTER A WITH OGONEK	
Encodings	decimal	hex	dec	hex
Unicode	260	U+0104	261	U+0105
UTF-8	196 132	C4 84	196 133	C4 85
Numeric character reference	&#260;	&#x104;	&#261;	&#x105;
Named character reference	&Aogon;		&aogon;	

== Gallery ==
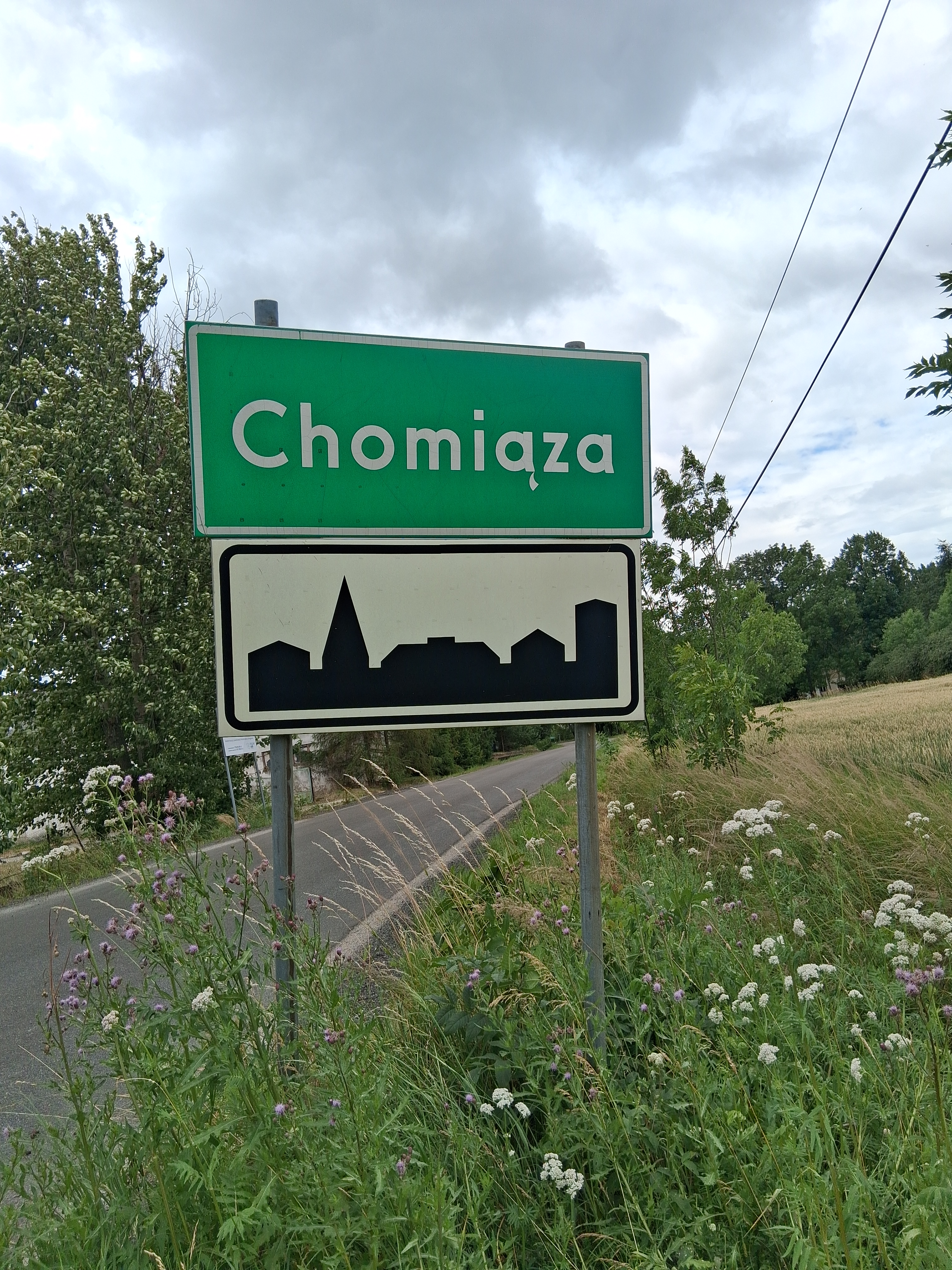
Chomiąża – ą on a road sign in Poland

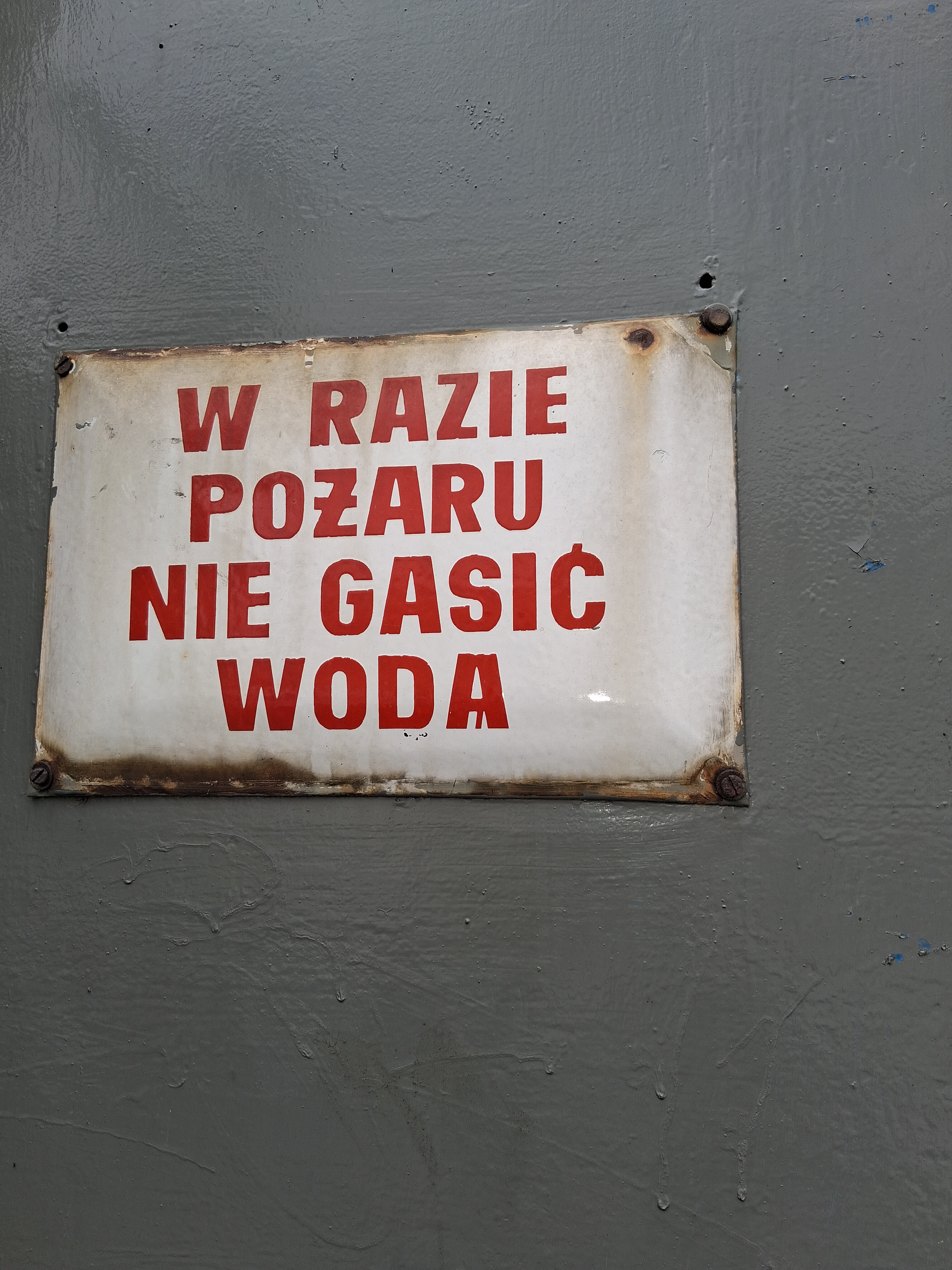
In case of fire, do not extinguish with water (W razie pożaru nie gasić wodą)

== See also ==
- Ę
- Ogonek
- Kashubian alphabet
- Lithuanian alphabet
- Elfdalian alphabet
- Polish phonology
- Polish alphabet
- Yus
