= Ę =

Latin letter E with ogonek

E with ogonek
- Ę ę

Usage
- Writing system: Latin script
- Type: alphabetic
- Sound values: [ɛ]; [ɛŋ]; [ɛw̃]; [ɛn̪]; [ɛm]; [ɛj̃]; [eː]; [e̝]; [ẽ]

Ę (minuscule: ę; Polish: e z ogonkiem, "e with a little tail"; Lithuanian: e nosinė, "nasal e") is a letter in the Polish, Lithuanian, and Dalecarlian alphabets. It is also used in Navajo to represent the nasal vowel [ẽ] and Kensiu to represent the near-open near-front unrounded vowel [e̝]. In Latin, Irish, and Old Norse palaeography, it is known as e caudata ('tailed e').

== Polish ==
In the Polish alphabet, ę comes after e. It never appears word-initially, except for the onomatopoeia ęsi. It does not have one determined pronunciation and instead, its pronunciation is dependent on the sounds it is followed by.

=== Pronunciation ===
Pronunciation of ę depending on its position
Position	Pronunciation		Example		
Position	Phonemic	Phonetic	Orthography	Pronunciation (phonemic)	Pronunciation (phonetic)
ę + f, w, s, z, sz, ż, rz, h, ch	/ɛŋ/	[ɛw̃]	kęs ('bite')	/kɛŋs/	[kɛw̃s]
ę + k, g	/ɛŋ/	[ɛŋ]	lęk ('fear')	/lɛŋk/	[lɛŋk]
ę + t, d, c, dz, cz, dż	/ɛn/	[ɛn̪]	będę ('I will be')	/ˈbɛndɛ/	[ˈbɛn̪d̪ɛ]
ę + p, b	/ɛm/	[ɛm]	sęp ('vulture')	/sɛmp/	[sɛmp]
ę + ś, ź, ć, dź, si, zi, ci, dzi	/ɛɲ/	[ɛj̃]	będzie ('it will be')	/ˈbɛɲd͡ʑɛ/	[ˈbɛj̃d͡ʑɛ]
ę + l, ł; word-finally	/ɛ/	[ɛ]	cię ('you')	/t͡ɕɛ/	[t͡ɕɛ]

In some dialects, word-final ę is also pronounced as /ɛm/, causing robię to be occasionally pronounced as /ˈrɔbjɛm/. That nonstandard form is used by the former Polish president Lech Wałęsa. Some of his sentences that were respelled to reflect the pronunciation have entered popular language, e.g., Nie chcem, ale muszem (properly written Nie chcę, ale muszę; 'I don't want to, but I have to').

=== History ===
In Old Polish, nasal vowels were either not indicated at all or indicated with digraphs including a nasal consonant; Ø was also used. During the first decades after the introduction of movable type to Poland (exclusively blackletter at the time) a need to standardize orthography developed, and in the early 16th century Stanisław Zaborowski, inspired by Old Czech orthography reform by Jan Hus, analyzed Polish phonology and in Orthographia seu modus recte scribendi et legendi Polonicum idioma quam utilissimus proposed to add diacritics to Polish, including to mark nasal vowels with strokes. In particular, he proposed to write the nasal e sound as a with semivirgula superior (the letter was used to spell the phoneme traditionally because it was the original medieval pronunciation, see below), which printers of the time found not very convenient, and instead, Hieronymus Vietor crossed the lower part of an e. Later, when Polish printers began to use antiqua in the late 16th-century, Jan Januszowski took E caudata from Latin lettercase so as not to cast a new letter.

Polish ę sound evolved from the short nasal a of medieval Polish, which developed into a short nasal e in the modern language. The medieval vowel, along with its long counterpart, evolved in turn from the merged nasal *ę and *ǫ of Late Proto-Slavic:

Evolution
Early Proto-Slavic	*em~*en and *am~*an
Late Proto-Slavic	/ẽ/ and /õ/, transcribed by ⟨ę⟩ and ⟨ǫ⟩
Medieval Polish	/ã/ and /ãː/, written approximately ⟨ø⟩
Modern Polish	/ã/ → /ɛŋ/, /ɛn/, /ɛm/, written ⟨ę⟩ /ãː/ → /ɔŋ/, /ɔn/, /ɔm/, written ⟨ą⟩

=== Alternations ===
Ę often alternates with ą:

- 'husband': mąż → mężowie ('husbands'),
- 'error': błąd → błędy ('errors'),
- 'pigeon': gołąb → gołębie ('pigeons')
- 'oak' in nominative: dąb → dębem (instrumental)
- 'hands' in nominative: ręce → rąk (genitive)
- 'five': pięć → piąty ('fifth')

== Lithuanian ==
In Lithuanian, the ogonek, called the nosinė (literally, "nasal") mark, originally indicated vowel nasalization, but around the late 17th century, nasal vowels gradually evolved into the corresponding long non-nasal vowels in most dialects. Thus, the mark is now de facto an indicator of vowel length (the length of etymologically non-nasal vowels is marked differently), and formerly nasal en/em forms are now pronounced [eː], as in kęsti (to suffer) – kenčia (is suffering or suffers), so the ę is no longer nasal.

The ogonek also helps to distinguish different grammatical forms which otherwise have the same written form but are pronounced differently. For example, for some forms of the noun, ę is used at the end of the word for the accusative case, as in eglę, accusative of eglė (spruce). It is also used to change past tense verb to the participle in the past, e.g., tempė to tempęs – somebody who has pulled.

In some cases, ą, ę and į (but never ė) may be used for different forms, as in tąsa (extension) – tęsia (extends) – tįsoti (to lie extended). Finally, some verbs have the letter in the middle of the word only in the present tense, e.g., gęsta ([fire, light] is going off) but not užgeso (went off).

Unlike with į or ą, no Lithuanian word is known to start with ę.

== Computer use ==
Character information
Preview	Ę		ę	
Unicode name	LATIN CAPITAL LETTER E WITH OGONEK		LATIN SMALL LETTER E WITH OGONEK	
Encodings	decimal	hex	dec	hex
Unicode	280	U+0118	281	U+0119
UTF-8	196 152	C4 98	196 153	C4 99
Numeric character reference	&#280;	&#x118;	&#281;	&#x119;
Named character reference	&Eogon;		&eogon;	
ISO 8859-2 / ISO 8859-4	202	CA	234	EA
ISO 8859-10	221	DD	253	FD

== Gallery ==
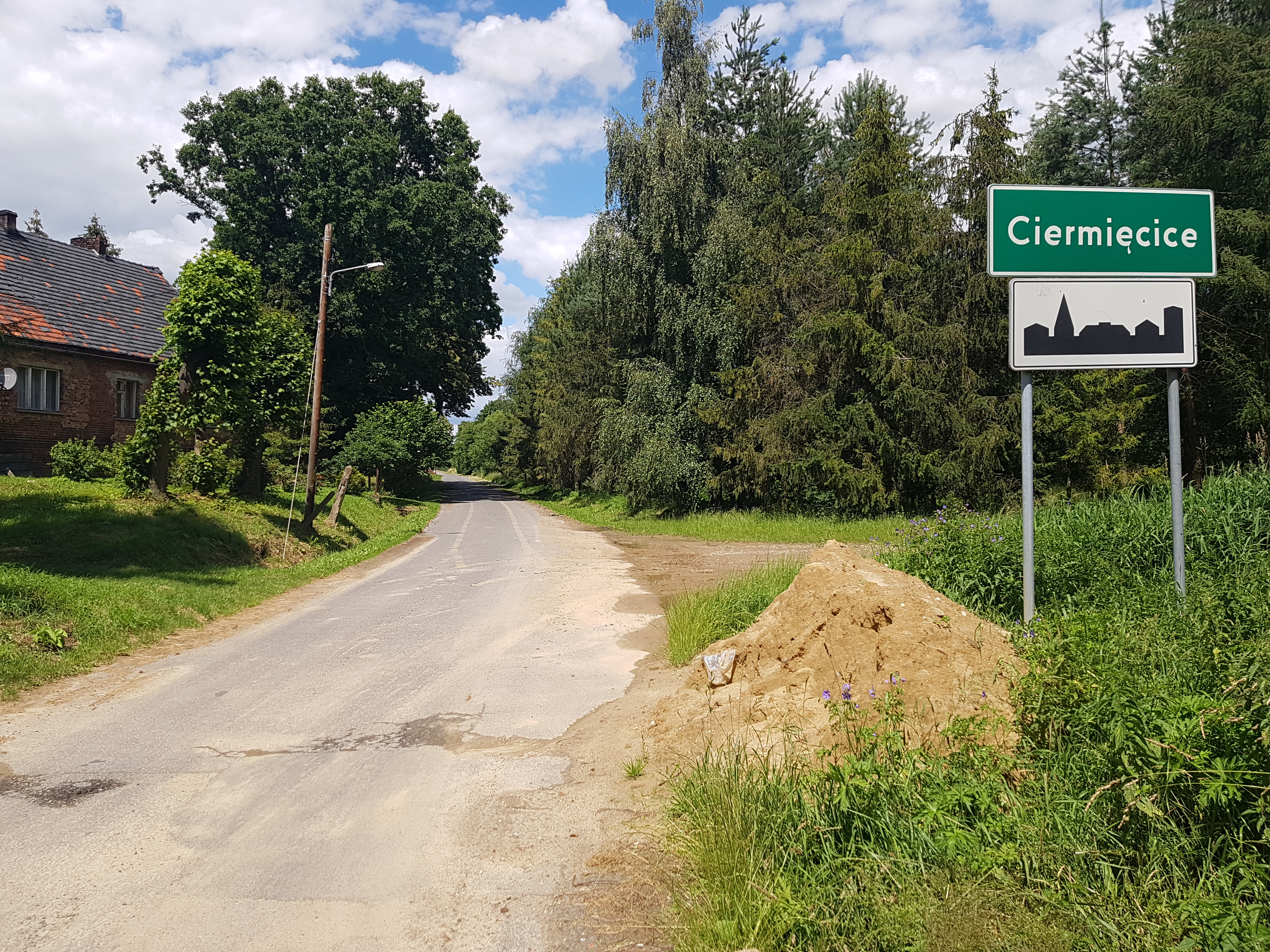
Ciermięcice – ę on a road sign in Poland

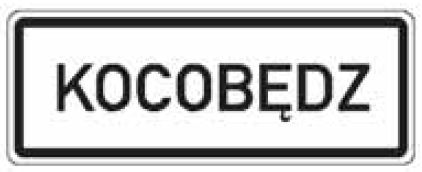
Kocobędz – ę on a road sign in Czechia in Polish

Tire Company Dębica, the Polish division of Goodyear Tire and Rubber Company

== See also ==
- Ą
- Polish phonology
- Polish alphabet
- Lithuanian orthography
- Ogonek
- Yus
