= Ogonek =

Diacritical mark

◌̨o

Ogonek
- U+0328 ◌̨ COMBINING OGONEK
◌᷎
U+1DCE ◌᷎ COMBINING OGONEK ABOVE

See also
- U+02DB ˛ OGONEK (&ogon;), spacing

The ogonek, (Note: /əˈɡɒnɛk, ˈoʊɡənɛk/ ə-GON-ek, OH-gən-ek; Polish: [ɔˈɡɔnɛk] 'little tail', diminutive of ogon) also informally referred to as the tail, is a diacritic hook placed under the lower right corner of a vowel grapheme in the Latin alphabets of Polish, Kashubian, Övdalian, and Lithuanian; and directly under a vowel in several Native American languages.

An ogonek can also be attached to the bottom of a vowel in Old Norse or Old Icelandic to show length or vowel affection. For example, in Old Norse, ǫ represents the Old Norwegian vowel [ɔ], which in Old Icelandic merges with ø ‹ö› and in modern Scandinavian languages is represented by the letter å.

== Use ==
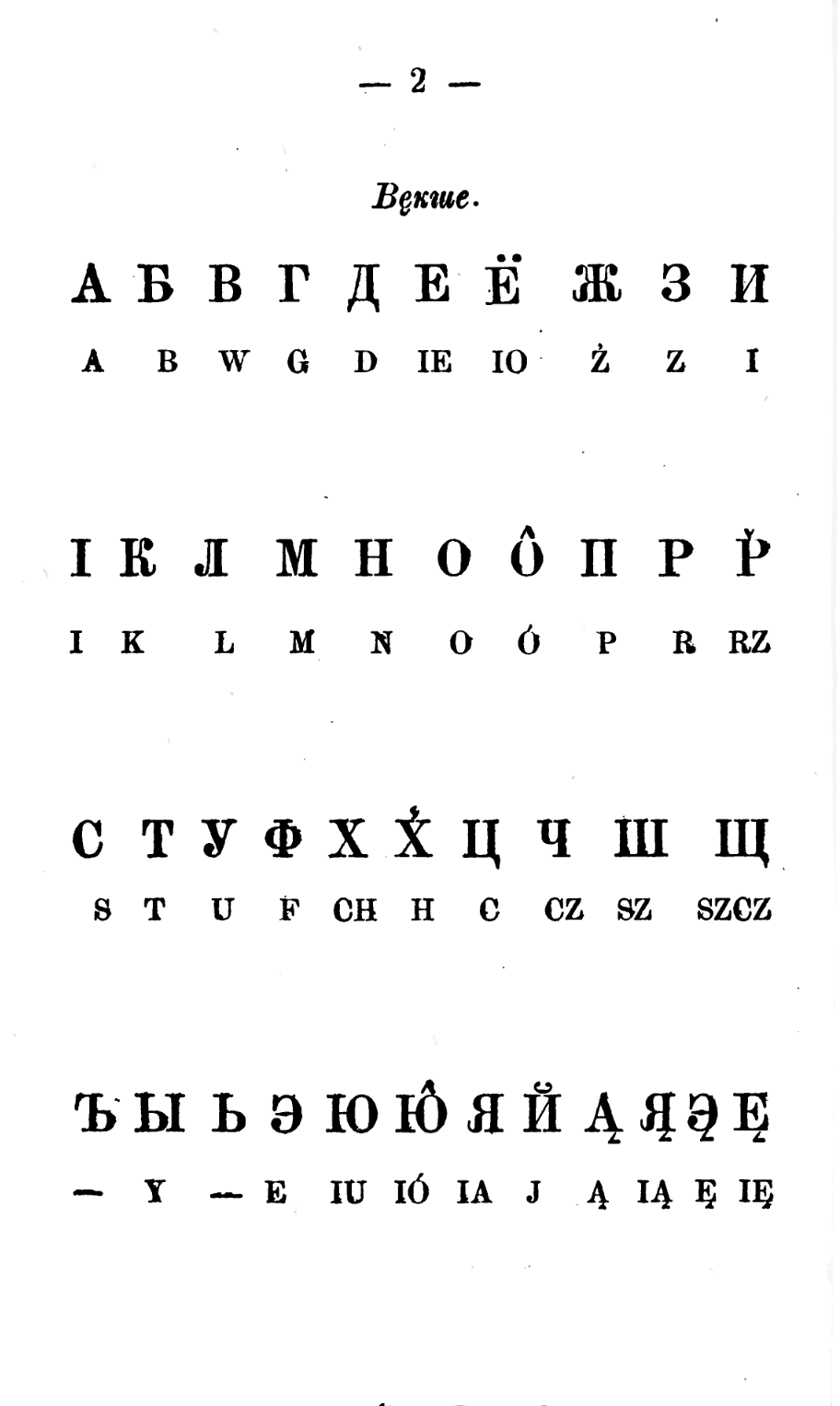
Polish was written in Cyrillic for a time in the 19th century, with the ogoneks applied to Cyrillic letters. Note the sharp angular design of this era.

- Avestan romanization (letters ą, ą̇, m̨)
- Cahto (ą, ę)
- Cayuga (ę, ǫ)
- Chickasaw (ą, į, ǫ)
- Chipewyan (ą ąą ę ęę ę̈ ę̈ę̈ ı̨ ı̨ı̨ ǫ ǫǫ ų ųų)
- Dadibi (ą, ę, į, ǫ)
- Dogrib (ą, ąą, ę, ęę, ı̨, ı̨ı̨, ǫ, ǫǫ, ų, ųų)
- Elfdalian (ą, ę, į, ų, y̨ and ą̊)
- Ho-Chunk (ą, ąą, į, įį, ų, ųų)
- etymological Interslavic (ę, ų)
- Kashubian (ą)
- scholarly transcriptions of Vulgar Latin and Proto-Romance (ę, ǫ)
- Lithuanian (ą, ę, į, ų)
- Navajo (ą ą́ ąą ą́ą́ ę ę́ ęę ę́ę́ į į́ įį į́į́ ǫ ǫ́ ǫǫ ǫ́ǫ́)
- Ojibwe in older Romanization standards, representing either nasalization or vowel backing (ą, ąą, ą́, ę, įį, ǫǫ)
- scholarly transcriptions of Old Church Slavonic and Proto-Slavic (ę, ǫ)
- Old Norse (ǫ [ɔ], ǫ́ [ɔː], o᷎, ǫ᷎), (ę [ɛ], æ [ɛː]), (Alternatively, ą, ę, ǫ, ø̨, etc. instead represent any nasalized vowel ([ã], [ẽ], [õ], [ø̃], etc.) corresponding to the Norse runic letter Áss and the Proto-Norse runic letter AnsuR.) Also (t̨).
- Old Norwegian and Old Icelandic (æ̨, ø̨, a᷎, e᷎, i᷎, o᷎, ø᷎, u᷎)
- Onondaga at Six Nations of the Grand River (ę, ǫ), (at Onondaga Nation, eñ and oñ are used. ų is sometimes used for ǫ in scholarly literature)
- Polish (letters ą, ę)
- Rheinische Dokumenta (ą̈, ǫ, ǫ̈, ą̈ą̈, ǫǫ, ǫ̈ǫ̈)
- Sierra Otomi (ą, į, ę, ǫ, ų)
- Tutchone (į, ų, ų̈, ę, ą̈, ǫ, ą, z̨)

=== Example in Polish ===
Wół go pyta: „Panie chrząszczu,
Po cóż pan tak brzęczy w gąszczu?“

The ox asks him: "Mr. beetle,
Why do you buzz like that in the thicket?"

— Jan Brzechwa, Chrząszcz

=== Example in Cayuga ===
Ęyǫgwędę́hte ('we will become poor')

=== Example in Chickasaw ===
Nǫwali ('I am walking')

=== Example in Dogrib ===
dǫ sǫǫ̀łįį ('native people')

=== Example in Lithuanian ===
Lydėdami gęstančią žarą vėlai
Pakilo į dangų margi sakalai

— Vincas Mykolaitis-Putinas, Margi sakalai

=== Example in Elfdalian ===
Ja, eð war įe plåg að gęslkallum, dar eð war slaik uondlostjyner i gęslun.

— Vikar Margit Andersdotter, I fäbodlivet i gamla tider.

== Values ==
=== Nasalization ===
The use of the ogonek to indicate nasality is common in the transcription of the indigenous languages of the Americas. This usage originated in the orthographies created by Christian missionaries to transcribe these languages. Later, the practice was continued by Americanist anthropologists and linguists who still, to the present day, follow this convention in phonetic transcription (see Americanist phonetic notation).

The ogonek is also used to indicate a nasalized vowel in Polish, academic transliteration of Proto-Germanic, Old Church Slavonic, Navajo, Western Apache, Chiricahua, Tłįchǫ Yatiì, Slavey, Dëne Sųłiné and Elfdalian. In Polish, ę is nasalized e; however, ą is nasalized o, not a, because of a vowel shift: ą, originally a long nasal a, turned into a short nasal o when the distinction in vowel quantity disappeared.

=== Length ===
In Lithuanian, the nosinė (lit. 'nasal') mark originally indicated vowel nasalization, but around late 17th and early 18th century, nasal vowels gradually evolved into the corresponding long non-nasal vowels in most dialects. Thus, the mark is now de facto an indicator of vowel length (the length of etymologically non-nasal vowels is marked differently or not marked at all). The mark also helps to distinguish different grammatical forms with otherwise the same written form (often with a different word stress, which is not indicated directly in the standard orthography).

=== Lowered articulation ===
Between 1927 and 1989, the ogonek denoted lowering in vowels, and, since 1976, in consonants as well, in the International Phonetic Alphabet (IPA). While the obsolete diacritic has also been identified as the left half ring diacritic ⟨◌̜⟩, many publications of the IPA used the ogonek.

In Rheinische Dokumenta, it marks vowels that are more open than those denoted by their base letters Ää, Oo, Öö. In two cases, it can be combined with umlaut marks.

== Similar diacritics ==
=== E caudata and o caudata ===
The E caudata (ę), a symbol similar to an e with ogonek, evolved from a ligature of a and e in medieval scripts, in Latin and Irish palaeography. The O caudata of Old Norse (letter ǫ, with ǫ́) is used to write the open-mid back rounded vowel, /ɔ/. Medieval Nordic manuscripts show this "hook" in both directions, in combination with several vowels. Despite this distinction, the term "ogonek" is sometimes used in discussions of typesetting and encoding Norse texts, as o caudata is typographically identical to o with ogonek. Similarly, the E caudata was sometimes used to designate the Norse vowel [ɛ] or [æ].

=== Cedilla and comma ===
The ogonek is functionally equivalent to the cedilla and comma diacritic marks. If two of these three are used within the same orthography their respective use is restricted to certain classes of letters, i.e. usually the ogonek is used with vowels whereas the cedilla is applied to consonants. In handwritten text, the marks may even look the same.

=== Superscript ogonek ===
In Old Norse and Old Icelandic manuscripts, there is an over-hook or curl that may be considered a variant of the ogonek. It occurs on the letters a᷎ e᷎ i᷎ o᷎ ø᷎ u᷎.

== Letters with ogonek ==
Letters with ogonek that are in use are:

- Ogonek ◌̨ Ą ą
- Ą́ ą́
- Ą̃ ą̃
- Ą̈ ą̈
- Ą̊ ą̊
- Æ̨ æ̨
- Ę ę
- Ę́ ę́
- Ę̃ ę̃
- Į į
- Į́ į́
- Į̃ į̃
- M̨ m̨
- Ǫ ǫ
- Ǭ ǭ
- Ǫ̈ ǫ̈
- Ǫ́ ǫ́
- Ø̨ ø̨
- Ų ų
- Ų́ ų́
- Ų̃ ų̃
- Ų̈ ų̈
- Y̨ y̨

== Typographical notes ==
The ogonek should be almost the same size as a descender (relatively, its size in larger type may be significantly shorter), and should not be confused with the cedilla or comma diacritics used in other languages.

=== Encoding ===
Because attaching an ogonek does not affect the shape of the base letter, Unicode covers it with a combining diacritic, U+0328. There are a number of precomposed legacy characters, but new ones are not being added to Unicode (e.g. for ⟨æ̨⟩ or ⟨ø̨⟩).

Character information
Preview	˛		̨		᷎	
Unicode name	OGONEK		COMBINING OGONEK		COMBINING OGONEK ABOVE	
Encodings	decimal	hex	dec	hex	dec	hex
Unicode	731	U+02DB	808	U+0328	7630	U+1DCE
UTF-8	203 155	CB 9B	204 168	CC A8	225 183 142	E1 B7 8E
Numeric character reference	&#731;	&#x2DB;	&#808;	&#x328;	&#7630;	&#x1DCE;
Named character reference	&ogon;					

Character information
Preview	Ą		ą		Ę		ę	
Unicode name	LATIN CAPITAL LETTER A WITH OGONEK		LATIN SMALL LETTER A WITH OGONEK		LATIN CAPITAL LETTER E WITH OGONEK		LATIN SMALL LETTER E WITH OGONEK	
Encodings	decimal	hex	dec	hex	dec	hex	dec	hex
Unicode	260	U+0104	261	U+0105	280	U+0118	281	U+0119
UTF-8	196 132	C4 84	196 133	C4 85	196 152	C4 98	196 153	C4 99
Numeric character reference	&#260;	&#x104;	&#261;	&#x105;	&#280;	&#x118;	&#281;	&#x119;
Named character reference	&Aogon;		&aogon;		&Eogon;		&eogon;	
ISO 8859-2 / ISO 8859-4 / ISO 8859-10	161	A1	177	B1	202	CA	234	EA
Named character reference	&Aogon;		&aogon;		&Eogon;		&eogon;	

Character information
Preview	Į		į		Ǫ		ǫ	
Unicode name	LATIN CAPITAL LETTER I WITH OGONEK		LATIN SMALL LETTER I WITH OGONEK		LATIN CAPITAL LETTER O WITH OGONEK		LATIN SMALL LETTER O WITH OGONEK	
Encodings	decimal	hex	dec	hex	dec	hex	dec	hex
Unicode	302	U+012E	303	U+012F	490	U+01EA	491	U+01EB
UTF-8	196 174	C4 AE	196 175	C4 AF	199 170	C7 AA	199 171	C7 AB
Numeric character reference	&#302;	&#x12E;	&#303;	&#x12F;	&#490;	&#x1EA;	&#491;	&#x1EB;
Named character reference	&Iogon;		&iogon;					
Named character reference	&Iogon;		&iogon;					

Character information
Preview	Ǭ		ǭ		Ų		ų	
Unicode name	LATIN CAPITAL LETTER O WITH OGONEK; AND MACRON		LATIN SMALL LETTER O WITH OGONEK; AND MACRON		LATIN CAPITAL LETTER U WITH OGONEK		LATIN SMALL LETTER U WITH OGONEK	
Encodings	decimal	hex	dec	hex	dec	hex	dec	hex
Unicode	492	U+01EC	493	U+01ED	370	U+0172	371	U+0173
UTF-8	199 172	C7 AC	199 173	C7 AD	197 178	C5 B2	197 179	C5 B3
Numeric character reference	&#492;	&#x1EC;	&#493;	&#x1ED;	&#370;	&#x172;	&#371;	&#x173;
Named character reference					&Uogon;		&uogon;	
Named character reference					&Uogon;		&uogon;	

=== LaTeX2e ===
In LaTeX2e, macro \k will typeset a letter with ogonek, if it is supported by the font encoding, e.g. \k{a} will typeset ą. (The default LaTeX OT1 encoding does not support it, but the newer T1 one does. It may be enabled by saying \usepackage[T1]{fontenc} in the preamble.)

However, \k{e} rather places the diacritic "right-aligned" with the carrying e (ę), suitably for Polish, while \textogonekcentered horizontally centers the diacritic with respect to the carrier, suitably for indigenous languages of the Americas as well as for e caudata and o caudata. So \textogonekcentered{e} better fits the latter purposes. Actually, \k{o} (for ǫ) is defined to result in \textogonekcentered{o}, and \k{O} is defined to result in \textogonekcentered{O}.

The package TIPA, activated by using the command "\usepackage{tipa}", offers a different way: "\textpolhook{a}" will produce ą.
