= EBU Latin =

EBU Latin is specialized character set for use in some radio data systems.

It is used in Digital Audio Broadcasting. In 2015 it underwent significant additions and changes. Older version corresponds to RDS character set.

== Character table ==
| | 0 | 1 | 2 | 3 | 4 | 5 | 6 | 7 | 8 | 9 | A | B | C | D | E | F |
|---|---|---|---|---|---|---|---|---|---|---|---|---|---|---|---|---|
| 0_ | — | — | — | — | — | — | — | — | — | — | — | — | — | — | — | — |
| 0_ | — | Ę | Į | Ų | Ă | Ė | Ď | Ș | Ț | Ċ | — | — | Ġ | Ĺ | Ż | Ń |
| 1_ | — | — | — | — | — | — | — | — | — | — | — | — | — | — | — | — |
| 1_ | ą | ę | į | ų | ă | ė | ď | ș | ț | ċ | Ň | Ě | ġ | ĺ | ż | — |
| 2_ | | ! | " | # | ¤ | % | & | ' | ( | ) | * | + | , | - | . | / |
| 2_ | | ! | " | # | ł | % | & | ' | ( | ) | * | + | , | - | . | / |
| 3_ | 0 | 1 | 2 | 3 | 4 | 5 | 6 | 7 | 8 | 9 | : | ; | < | = | > | ? |
| 4_ | @ | A | B | C | D | E | F | G | H | I | J | K | L | M | N | O |
| 5_ | P | Q | R | S | T | U | V | W | X | Y | Z | [ | \ | ] | ― | _ |
| 5_ | P | Q | R | S | T | U | V | W | X | Y | Z | [ | Ů | ] | Ł | _ |
| 6_ | ║ | a | b | c | d | e | f | g | h | i | j | k | l | m | n | o |
| 6_ | Ą | a | b | c | d | e | f | g | h | i | j | k | l | m | n | o |
| 7_ | p | q | r | s | t | u | v | w | x | y | z | { | | | } | ¯ | — |
| 7_ | p | q | r | s | t | u | v | w | x | y | z | « | ů | » | Ľ | Ħ |
| 8_ | á | à | é | è | í | ì | ó | ò | ú | ù | Ñ | Ç | Ş | ß | ¡ | Ĳ |
| 8_ | á | à | é | è | í | ì | ó | ò | ú | ù | Ñ | Ç | Ş | ß | ¡ | Ÿ |
| 9_ | â | ä | ê | ë | î | ï | ô | ö | û | ü | ñ | ç | ş | ğ | ı | ĳ |
| 9_ | â | ä | ê | ë | î | ï | ô | ö | û | ü | ñ | ç | ş | ğ | ı | ÿ |
| A_ | ª | α | © | ‰ | Ğ | ě | ň | ő | π | € | £ | $ | ← | ↑ | → | ↓ |
| A_ | Ķ | Ņ | © | Ģ | Ğ | ě | ň | ő | Ő | € | £ | $ | Ā | Ē | Ī | Ū |
| B_ | º | ¹ | ² | ³ | ± | İ | ń | ű | µ | ¿ | ÷ | ° | ¼ | ½ | ¾ | § |
| B_ | ķ | ņ | Ļ | ģ | ļ | İ | ń | ű | Ű | ¿ | ľ | ° | ā | ē | ī | ū |
| C_ | Á | À | É | È | Í | Ì | Ó | Ò | Ú | Ù | Ř | Č | Š | Ž | Ð | Ŀ |
| D_ | Â | Ä | Ê | Ë | Î | Ï | Ô | Ö | Û | Ü | ř | č | š | ž | đ | ŀ |
| E_ | Ã | Å | Æ | Œ | ŷ | Ý | Õ | Ø | Þ | Ŋ | Ŕ | Ć | Ś | Ź | Ŧ | ð |
| E_ | Ã | Å | Æ | Œ | ŷ | Ý | Õ | Ø | Þ | Ŋ | Ŕ | Ć | Ś | Ź | Ť | ð |
| F_ | ã | å | æ | œ | ŵ | ý | õ | ø | þ | ŋ | ŕ | ć | ś | ź | ŧ | — |
| F_ | ã | å | æ | œ | ŵ | ý | õ | ø | þ | ŋ | ŕ | ć | ś | ź | ť | ħ |

Where a cell is vertically split, upper value is of old and lower part of new value, from ETSI TS 101 756 v1.6.1 and v1.8.1, (Note: Version 1.7.1 was withdrawn.) respectively.

== See also ==
- Teletext character set
