= Latin Extended-A =

- Range: U+0100..U+017F (128 code points)
- Plane: BMP
- Scripts: Latin
- Major alphabets: Afrikaans; Catalan; Croatian; Czech; Esperanto; Greenlandic; Hungarian; Kashubian; Kurdish; Latin; Latvian; Lithuanian; Maltese; Northern Sami; Polish; Romanian; Serbian; Slovak; Slovene; Sorbian; Turkish; Welsh
- Assigned: 128 code points
- Unused: 0 reserved code points 1 deprecated
- Source standards: ISO/IEC 8859, ISO 6937

Unicode Version History
- 1.0.0 (1991): 127 (+127)
- 1.1 (1993): 128 (+1)

Unicode documentation
- Code chart ∣ Web page

Latin Extended-A is a Unicode block and is the third block of the Unicode standard. It encodes Latin letters from the Latin ISO character sets other than Latin-1 (which is already encoded in the Latin-1 Supplement block) and also legacy characters from the ISO 6937 standard.

The Latin Extended-A block has been in the Unicode Standard since version 1.0, with its entire character repertoire, except for the Latin Small Letter Long S, which was added during unification with ISO 10646 in version 1.1. Its block name in Unicode 1.0 was European Latin.

== Character table ==
Code (hex)	Grapheme	Names
European Latin
U+0100	Ā	Latin Capital letter A with macron
U+0101	ā	Latin Small letter A with macron
U+0102	Ă	Latin Capital letter A with breve
U+0103	ă	Latin Small letter A with breve
U+0104	Ą	Latin Capital letter A with ogonek
U+0105	ą	Latin Small letter A with ogonek
U+0106	Ć	Latin Capital letter C with acute
U+0107	ć	Latin Small letter C with acute
U+0108	Ĉ	Latin Capital letter C with circumflex
U+0109	ĉ	Latin Small letter C with circumflex
U+010A	Ċ	Latin Capital letter C with dot above
U+010B	ċ	Latin Small letter C with dot above
U+010C	Č	Latin Capital letter C with caron
U+010D	č	Latin Small letter C with caron
U+010E	Ď	Latin Capital letter D with caron
U+010F	ď	Latin Small letter D with caron
U+0110	Đ	Latin Capital letter D with stroke
U+0111	đ	Latin Small letter D with stroke
U+0112	Ē	Latin Capital letter E with macron
U+0113	ē	Latin Small letter E with macron
U+0114	Ĕ	Latin Capital letter E with breve
U+0115	ĕ	Latin Small letter E with breve
U+0116	Ė	Latin Capital letter E with dot above
U+0117	ė	Latin Small letter E with dot above
U+0118	Ę	Latin Capital letter E with ogonek
U+0119	ę	Latin Small letter E with ogonek
U+011A	Ě	Latin Capital letter E with caron
U+011B	ě	Latin Small letter E with caron
U+011C	Ĝ	Latin Capital letter G with circumflex
U+011D	ĝ	Latin Small letter G with circumflex
U+011E	Ğ	Latin Capital letter G with breve
U+011F	ğ	Latin Small letter G with breve
U+0120	Ġ	Latin Capital letter G with dot above
U+0121	ġ	Latin Small letter G with dot above
U+0122	Ģ	Latin Capital letter G with cedilla
U+0123	ģ	Latin Small letter G with cedilla
U+0124	Ĥ	Latin Capital letter H with circumflex
U+0125	ĥ	Latin Small letter H with circumflex
U+0126	Ħ	Latin Capital letter H with stroke
U+0127	ħ	Latin Small letter H with stroke
U+0128	Ĩ	Latin Capital letter I with tilde
U+0129	ĩ	Latin Small letter I with tilde
U+012A	Ī	Latin Capital letter I with macron
U+012B	ī	Latin Small letter I with macron
U+012C	Ĭ	Latin Capital letter I with breve
U+012D	ĭ	Latin Small letter I with breve
U+012E	Į	Latin Capital letter I with ogonek
U+012F	į	Latin Small letter I with ogonek
U+0130	İ	Latin Capital letter I with dot above
U+0131	ı	Latin Small letter dotless I
U+0132	Ĳ	Latin Capital Ligature IJ
U+0133	ĳ	Latin Small Ligature IJ
U+0134	Ĵ	Latin Capital letter J with circumflex
U+0135	ĵ	Latin Small letter J with circumflex
U+0136	Ķ	Latin Capital letter K with cedilla
U+0137	ķ	Latin Small letter K with cedilla
U+0138	ĸ	Latin Small letter Kra
U+0139	Ĺ	Latin Capital letter L with acute
U+013A	ĺ	Latin Small letter L with acute
U+013B	Ļ	Latin Capital letter L with cedilla
U+013C	ļ	Latin Small letter L with cedilla
U+013D	Ľ	Latin Capital letter L with caron
U+013E	ľ	Latin Small letter L with caron
U+013F	Ŀ	Latin Capital letter L with middle dot
U+0140	ŀ	Latin Small letter L with middle dot
U+0141	Ł	Latin Capital letter L with stroke
U+0142	ł	Latin Small letter L with stroke
U+0143	Ń	Latin Capital letter N with acute
U+0144	ń	Latin Small letter N with acute
U+0145	Ņ	Latin Capital letter N with cedilla
U+0146	ņ	Latin Small letter N with cedilla
U+0147	Ň	Latin Capital letter N with caron
U+0148	ň	Latin Small letter N with caron
Deprecated Letter
U+0149	ŉ	Latin Small letter N preceded by apostrophe (Deprecated letter)
European Latin
U+014A	Ŋ	Latin Capital letter Eng
U+014B	ŋ	Latin Small letter Eng
U+014C	Ō	Latin Capital letter O with macron
U+014D	ō	Latin Small letter O with macron
U+014E	Ŏ	Latin Capital letter O with breve
U+014F	ŏ	Latin Small letter O with breve
U+0150	Ő	Latin Capital Letter O with double acute
U+0151	ő	Latin Small Letter O with double acute
U+0152	Œ	Latin Capital Ligature OE
U+0153	œ	Latin Small Ligature OE
U+0154	Ŕ	Latin Capital letter R with acute
U+0155	ŕ	Latin Small letter R with acute
U+0156	Ŗ	Latin Capital letter R with cedilla
U+0157	ŗ	Latin Small letter R with cedilla
U+0158	Ř	Latin Capital letter R with caron
U+0159	ř	Latin Small letter R with caron
U+015A	Ś	Latin Capital letter S with acute
U+015B	ś	Latin Small letter S with acute
U+015C	Ŝ	Latin Capital letter S with circumflex
U+015D	ŝ	Latin Small letter S with circumflex
U+015E	Ş	Latin Capital letter S with cedilla
U+015F	ş	Latin Small letter S with cedilla
U+0160	Š	Latin Capital letter S with caron
U+0161	š	Latin Small letter S with caron
U+0162	Ţ	Latin Capital letter T with cedilla
U+0163	ţ	Latin Small letter T with cedilla
U+0164	Ť	Latin Capital letter T with caron
U+0165	ť	Latin Small letter T with caron
U+0166	Ŧ	Latin Capital letter T with stroke
U+0167	ŧ	Latin Small letter T with stroke
U+0168	Ũ	Latin Capital letter U with tilde
U+0169	ũ	Latin Small letter U with tilde
U+016A	Ū	Latin Capital letter U with macron
U+016B	ū	Latin Small letter U with macron
U+016C	Ŭ	Latin Capital letter U with breve
U+016D	ŭ	Latin Small letter U with breve
U+016E	Ů	Latin Capital letter U with ring above
U+016F	ů	Latin Small letter U with ring above
U+0170	Ű	Latin Capital Letter U with double acute
U+0171	ű	Latin Small Letter U with double acute
U+0172	Ų	Latin Capital letter U with ogonek
U+0173	ų	Latin Small letter U with ogonek
U+0174	Ŵ	Latin Capital letter W with circumflex
U+0175	ŵ	Latin Small letter W with circumflex
U+0176	Ŷ	Latin Capital letter Y with circumflex
U+0177	ŷ	Latin Small letter Y with circumflex
U+0178	Ÿ	Latin Capital letter Y with diaeresis
U+0179	Ź	Latin Capital letter Z with acute
U+017A	ź	Latin Small letter Z with acute
U+017B	Ż	Latin Capital letter Z with dot above
U+017C	ż	Latin Small letter Z with dot above
U+017D	Ž	Latin Capital letter Z with caron
U+017E	ž	Latin Small letter Z with caron
U+017F	ſ	Latin Small letter long S

== Subheadings ==
The Latin Extended-A block contains only two subheadings: European Latin and Deprecated letter.

=== European Latin ===
The European Latin subheading contains all but one character in the Latin Extended-A block. It is populated with accented and variant majuscule and minuscule Latin letters for writing mostly eastern European languages.

=== Deprecated letter ===
The Deprecated letter subheading contains a single character, Latin Small Letter N Preceded by Apostrophe, which was included for compatibility with the ISO/IEC 6937 standard. It was deprecated as of Unicode version 5.2.0, with the comment that U+0149 ŉ LATIN SMALL LETTER N PRECEDED BY APOSTROPHE was encoded for use in Afrikaans. The character is deprecated, and its use is strongly discouraged. In nearly all cases it is better represented by a sequence of an apostrophe followed by the letter "n": 'n.

== Table ==
Type of subheading	Number of symbols	Range of characters
European Latin	63 pairs of European Latin letters, Latin Small Letter N preceded by apostrophe (ŉ) U+0149 and Latin Small Letter long S (ſ) U+017F	U+0100 to U+017F (Including the Deprecated Letter, ŉ, U+0149)
Deprecated Letter	Latin Small Letter N preceded by apostrophe (ŉ) U+0149	U+0149

== Compact table ==
Latin Extended-A^{[1]}^{[2]} Official Unicode Consortium code chart (PDF)
	0	1	2	3	4	5	6	7	8	9	A	B	C	D	E	F
U+010x	Ā	ā	Ă	ă	Ą	ą	Ć	ć	Ĉ	ĉ	Ċ	ċ	Č	č	Ď	ď
U+011x	Đ	đ	Ē	ē	Ĕ	ĕ	Ė	ė	Ę	ę	Ě	ě	Ĝ	ĝ	Ğ	ğ
U+012x	Ġ	ġ	Ģ	ģ	Ĥ	ĥ	Ħ	ħ	Ĩ	ĩ	Ī	ī	Ĭ	ĭ	Į	į
U+013x	İ	ı	Ĳ	ĳ	Ĵ	ĵ	Ķ	ķ	ĸ	Ĺ	ĺ	Ļ	ļ	Ľ	ľ	Ŀ
U+014x	ŀ	Ł	ł	Ń	ń	Ņ	ņ	Ň	ň	ŉ	Ŋ	ŋ	Ō	ō	Ŏ	ŏ
U+015x	Ő	ő	Œ	œ	Ŕ	ŕ	Ŗ	ŗ	Ř	ř	Ś	ś	Ŝ	ŝ	Ş	ş
U+016x	Š	š	Ţ	ţ	Ť	ť	Ŧ	ŧ	Ũ	ũ	Ū	ū	Ŭ	ŭ	Ů	ů
U+017x	Ű	ű	Ų	ų	Ŵ	ŵ	Ŷ	ŷ	Ÿ	Ź	ź	Ż	ż	Ž	ž	ſ
Notes 1.As of Unicode version 17.0 2.Unicode code point U+0149 is deprecated as of Unicode version 5.2

== History ==
The following Unicode-related documents record the purpose and process of defining specific characters in the Latin Extended-A block:

Version	Final code points (Note: Proposed code points and characters names may differ from final code points and names)	Count	L2 ID	Document
1.0.0	U+0100..017E	127		(to be determined)
1.0.0	U+0100..017E	127	L2/08-275	Freytag, Asmus (2008-07-31), Comments on the proposed deprecation of characters (public review item #122)
1.0.0	U+0100..017E	127	L2/08-278	Pentzlin, Karl (2008-08-04), Comments on Public Review Issue #122
1.0.0	U+0100..017E	127	L2/08-287	Davis, Mark (2008-08-04), Public Review Issue #122: Proposal for Additional Deprecated Characters
1.0.0	U+0100..017E	127	L2/08-253R2	Moore, Lisa (2008-08-19), "Consensus 116-C13", UTC #116 Minutes, "Change the deprecated property by removing 0340, 0341, 17D3, and adding 0149, 0F77, 0F79, 17A4, 2329, 232A."
1.0.0	U+0100..017E	127	L2/08-328 (html, xls)	Whistler, Ken (2008-10-14), Spreadsheet of Deprecation and Discouragement
1.0.0	U+0100..017E	127	L2/10-268	Priest, Lorna (2010-07-29), Annotation additions resulting from encoding LATIN CAPITAL LETTER H WITH HOOK
1.1	U+017F	1		(to be determined)

== See also ==
- Phonetic symbols in Unicode
