= ISO/IEC 8859 =

Series of standards for 8-bit character encodings

ISO 8859 encoding family
- Standard: ISO/IEC 8859
- Classification: 8-bit extended ASCII, ISO/IEC 4873 level 1
- Extends: ASCII
- Preceded by: ISO/IEC 646
- Succeeded by: ISO/IEC 10646 (Unicode)
- Other related encodings: ISO/IEC 10367, Windows-125x

ISO/IEC 8859 is a series of technical standards for 8-bit character encodings developed jointly by the International Organization for Standardization (ISO) and International Electrotechnical Commission (IEC). Each part is numbered: ISO/IEC 8859-1, ISO/IEC 8859-2, etc. There are 15 parts, excluding the abandoned ISO/IEC 8859-12. The ISO working group maintaining this series of standards has been disbanded.

ISO/IEC 8859 parts 1, 2, 3, and 4 were originally Ecma International standard ECMA-94.

== Introduction ==
While the bit patterns of the 95 printable ASCII characters are sufficient to exchange information in modern English, most other languages that use Latin alphabets need additional symbols not covered by ASCII. ISO/IEC 8859 sought to remedy this problem by utilizing the eighth bit in an 8-bit byte to allow positions for another 96 printable characters. Early encodings were limited to 7 bits because of restrictions of some data transmission protocols, and partially for historical reasons. However, more characters were needed than could fit in a single 8-bit character encoding, so several mappings were developed, including at least ten suitable for various Latin alphabets.

The ISO/IEC 8859 standard parts only define printable characters, although they explicitly set apart the byte ranges 0x00–1F and 0x7F–9F as "combinations that do not represent graphic characters" (i.e. which are reserved for use as control characters) in accordance with ISO/IEC 4873; they were designed to be used in conjunction with a separate standard defining the control functions associated with these bytes, such as ISO 6429 or ISO 6630. To this end a series of encodings registered with the IANA add the C0 control set (control characters mapped to bytes 0 to 31) from ISO 646 and the C1 control set (control characters mapped to bytes 128 to 159) from ISO 6429, resulting in full 8-bit character maps with most, if not all, bytes assigned. These sets have ISO-8859-n as their preferred MIME name or, in cases where a preferred MIME name is not specified, their canonical name. Many people use the terms ISO/IEC 8859-n and ISO-8859-n interchangeably. ISO/IEC 8859-11 did not get such a charset assigned, presumably because it was almost identical to TIS 620.

== Characters ==
The ISO/IEC 8859 standard is designed for reliable information exchange, not typography; the standard omits symbols needed for high-quality typography, such as optional ligatures, curly quotation marks, dashes, etc. As a result, high-quality typesetting systems often use proprietary or idiosyncratic extensions on top of the ASCII and ISO/IEC 8859 standards, or use Unicode instead.

An inexact rule based on practical experience states that if a character or symbol was not already part of a widely used data-processing character set and was also not usually provided on typewriter keyboards for a national language, it did not get in. Hence the directional double quotation marks « and » used for some European languages were included, but not the directional double quotation marks “ and ” used for English and some other languages.

French did not get its œ and Œ ligatures because they could be typed as 'oe'. Likewise, Ÿ, needed for all-caps text, was dropped as well. Albeit under different codepoints, these three characters were later reintroduced with ISO/IEC 8859-15 in 1999, which also introduced the new euro sign character €. Likewise Dutch did not get the ĳ and Ĳ letters, because Dutch speakers had become used to typing these as two letters instead.

Romanian did not initially get its Ș/ș and Ț/ț (with comma) letters, because these letters were initially unified with Ş/ş and Ţ/ţ (with cedilla) by the Unicode Consortium, considering the shapes with comma beneath to be glyph variants of the shapes with cedilla. However, the letters with explicit comma below were later added to the Unicode standard and are also in ISO/IEC 8859-16.

Most of the ISO/IEC 8859 encodings provide diacritic marks required for various European languages using the Latin script. Others provide non-Latin alphabets: Greek, Cyrillic, Hebrew, Arabic and Thai. Most of the encodings contain only spacing characters, although the Thai, Hebrew, and Arabic ones do also contain combining characters.

The standard makes no provision for the scripts of East Asian languages (CJK), as their ideographic writing systems require many thousands of code points. Although it uses Latin based characters, Vietnamese does not fit into 96 positions (without using combining diacritics such as in Windows-1258) either. Each Japanese syllabic alphabet (hiragana or katakana, see Kana) would fit, as in JIS X 0201, but like several other alphabets of the world they are not encoded in the ISO/IEC 8859 system.

== The parts of ISO/IEC 8859 ==
ISO/IEC 8859 is divided into the following parts:

Part	Name	Revisions	Other standards	Description
Part 1	Latin-1; Western European	1987, 1998	ECMA-94 (1985, 1986)	Perhaps the most widely used part of ISO/IEC 8859, covering most Western European languages: Danish (partial), (Note: Missing several accented vowels including Ǿ and ǿ. These can be replaced with non-accented vowels at the cost of increased ambiguity.) Dutch, (Note: The ISO 8859 encodings treat IJ as a digraph. Some other encodings treat it as a letter.) English, Faeroese, Finnish (partial), (Note: Missing characters are in ISO/IEC 8859-15.) French (partial), German, Icelandic, Irish, Italian, Norwegian, Portuguese, Rhaeto-Romanic, Scottish Gaelic, Spanish, Catalan, and Swedish. Languages from other parts of the world are also covered, including: Eastern European Albanian, Southeast Asian Indonesian, as well as the African languages Afrikaans and Swahili. A modification of DEC MCS; the first (1985) standard version at the ECMA level lacked the times sign and division obelus, which were added the next year. The missing euro sign and capital Ÿ are in the revised version ISO/IEC 8859-15 (see below). The corresponding IANA character set is ISO-8859-1.
Part 2	Latin-2; Central European	1987, 1999	ECMA-94 (1986) (Note: The 1985 edition includes only a version of ISO-8859-1.)	Supports those Central and Eastern European languages that use the Latin alphabet, including Bosnian, Polish, Croatian, Czech, Slovak, Slovene, Serbian, and Hungarian. The missing euro sign can be found in version ISO/IEC 8859-16.
Part 3	Latin-3; South European	1988, 1999	ECMA-94 (1986)	Turkish, Maltese, and Esperanto. Largely superseded by ISO/IEC 8859-9 for Turkish.
Part 4	Latin-4; North European	1988, 1998	ECMA-94 (1986)	Estonian, Latvian, Lithuanian, Greenlandic, and Sami.
Part 5	Latin/Cyrillic	1988, 1999	ECMA-113 (1988, 1999) (Note: The 1986 edition defines KOI8-E, which is an entirely different encoding.)	Covers mostly Slavic languages that use a Cyrillic alphabet, including Belarusian, Bulgarian, Macedonian, Russian, Serbian, and Ukrainian (partial). (Note: 8859-5 misses the Ґ/ґ letter, which was reintroduced into the Ukrainian alphabet in 1990.)
Part 6	Latin/Arabic	1987, 1999	ASMO 708 (1986); ECMA-114 (1986, 2000)	Covers the most common Arabic language characters. Does not support other languages using the Arabic script. Needs to be BiDi and cursive joining processed for display.
Part 7	Latin/Greek	1987, 2003	ELOT 928 (1986); ECMA-118 (1986)	Covers the modern Greek language (monotonic orthography). Can also be used for Ancient Greek written without accents or in monotonic orthography, but lacks the diacritics for polytonic orthography. These were introduced with Unicode. Updated 2003 to add the euro sign, drachma sign and spacing ypogegrammeni.
Part 8	Latin/Hebrew	1988, 1999	ECMA-121 (1987, 2000); SI 1311 (2002)	Covers the modern Hebrew alphabet as used in Israel. In practice two different encodings exist, logical order (needs to be BiDi processed for display) and visual (left-to-right) order (in effect, after bidi processing and line breaking). Updated 1999 to add LRM and RLM. Updated at national standard level in 2002 to add euro and shekel signs and more bidirectional format effectors; the 2002 additions were never incorporated back into the ISO standard version.
Part 9	Latin-5; Turkish	1989, 1999	TS 5881 (1988); ECMA-128 (1988, 1999)	Largely the same as ISO/IEC 8859-1, replacing the rarely used Icelandic letters with Turkish ones.
Part 10	Latin-6; Nordic	1992, 1998	ECMA-144 (1990, 1992, 2000)	A rearrangement of Latin-4. Considered more useful for Nordic languages. Baltic languages use Latin-4 more.
Part 11	Latin/Thai	2001	TIS-620 (1986, 1990)	Contains characters needed for the Thai language. First revision established in 1986 at national standard level as TIS 620. Elevated to ISO standard status as a part of ISO 8859 in 2001, with the addition of a non-breaking space.
~~Part 12~~	Latin/Devanagari	N/A	-	Originally proposed to support the Celtic languages, then slated for Latin/Devanagari, but abandoned in 1997, during the 12th meeting of ISO/IEC JTC 1/SC 2/WG 3. The Celtic proposal was changed to ISO 8859-14, with part 12 possibly being reserved for ISCII Indian.
Part 13	Latin-7; Baltic Rim	1998	-	Added some characters for Baltic languages which were missing from Latin-4 and Latin-6. Related to the earlier-published (Note: Published 1995, registered 1996.) Windows-1257.
Part 14	Latin-8; Celtic	1998	-	Covers Celtic languages such as Gaelic and the Breton language. Welsh letters correspond to the earlier (1994) ISO-IR-182.
Part 15	Latin-9	1999	-	A revision of 8859-1 that removes some little-used symbols, replacing them with the euro sign € and the letters Š, š, Ž, ž, Œ, œ, and Ÿ, which completes the coverage of French, Finnish and Estonian.
Part 16	Latin-10; South-Eastern European	2001	SR 14111 (1998)	Intended for Albanian, Croatian, Hungarian, Italian, Polish, Romanian and Slovene, but also Finnish, French, German and Irish Gaelic (new orthography). The focus lies more on letters than symbols. The generic currency sign is replaced with the euro sign.

Each part of ISO/IEC 8859 is designed to support languages that often borrow from each other, so the characters needed by each language are usually accommodated by a single part. However, there are some characters and language combinations that are not accommodated without transcriptions. Efforts were made to make conversions as smooth as possible. For example, German has all of its seven special characters at the same positions in all Latin variants (1–4, 9, 10, 13–16), and in many positions the characters only differ in the diacritics between the sets. In particular, variants 1–4 were designed jointly, and have the property that every encoded character appears either at a given position or not at all.

=== Table ===
Comparison of the various parts (1–16) of ISO/IEC 8859
Binary	Oct	Dec	Hex	1	2	3	4	5	6	7	8	9	10	11	13	14	15	16
1010 0000	240	160	A0	Non-breaking space (NBSP)														
1010 0001	241	161	A1	¡	Ą	Ħ	Ą	Ё		‘		¡	Ą	ก	”	Ḃ	¡	Ą
1010 0010	242	162	A2	¢	˘		ĸ	Ђ		’	¢		Ē	ข	¢	ḃ	¢	ą
1010 0011	243	163	A3	£	Ł	£	Ŗ	Ѓ		£			Ģ	ฃ	£			Ł
1010 0100	244	164	A4	¤				Є	¤	€	¤		Ī	ค	¤	Ċ	€	
1010 0101	245	165	A5	¥	Ľ		Ĩ	Ѕ		₯	¥		Ĩ	ฅ	„	ċ	¥	„
1010 0110	246	166	A6	¦	Ś	Ĥ	Ļ	І		¦			Ķ	ฆ	¦	Ḋ	Š	
1010 0111	247	167	A7	§				Ї		§				ง	§			
1010 1000	250	168	A8	¨				Ј		¨			Ļ	จ	Ø	Ẁ	š	
1010 1001	251	169	A9	©	Š	İ	Š	Љ		©			Đ	ฉ	©			
1010 1010	252	170	AA	ª	Ş		Ē	Њ		ͺ	×	ª	Š	ช	Ŗ	Ẃ	ª	Ș
1010 1011	253	171	AB	«	Ť	Ğ	Ģ	Ћ		«			Ŧ	ซ	«	ḋ	«	
1010 1100	254	172	AC	¬	Ź	Ĵ	Ŧ	Ќ	،	¬			Ž	ฌ	¬	Ỳ	¬	Ź
1010 1101	255	173	AD	Soft hyphen (SHY)										ญ	SHY			
1010 1110	256	174	AE	®	Ž		Ž	Ў			®		Ū	ฎ	®			ź
1010 1111	257	175	AF	¯	Ż		¯	Џ		―	¯		Ŋ	ฏ	Æ	Ÿ	¯	Ż
1011 0000	260	176	B0	°				А		°				ฐ	°	Ḟ	°	
1011 0001	261	177	B1	±	ą	ħ	ą	Б		±			ą	ฑ	±	ḟ	±	
1011 0010	262	178	B2	²	˛	²	˛	В		²			ē	ฒ	²	Ġ	²	Č
1011 0011	263	179	B3	³	ł	³	ŗ	Г		³			ģ	ณ	³	ġ	³	ł
1011 0100	264	180	B4	´				Д		΄	´		ī	ด	“	Ṁ	Ž	
1011 0101	265	181	B5	µ	ľ	µ	ĩ	Е		΅	µ		ĩ	ต	µ	ṁ	µ	”
1011 0110	266	182	B6	¶	ś	ĥ	ļ	Ж		Ά	¶		ķ	ถ	¶			
1011 0111	267	183	B7	·	ˇ	·	ˇ	З		·				ท	·	Ṗ	·	
1011 1000	270	184	B8	¸				И		Έ	¸		ļ	ธ	ø	ẁ	ž	
1011 1001	271	185	B9	¹	š	ı	š	Й		Ή	¹		đ	น	¹	ṗ	¹	č
1011 1010	272	186	BA	º	ş		ē	К		Ί	÷	º	š	บ	ŗ	ẃ	º	ș
1011 1011	273	187	BB	»	ť	ğ	ģ	Л	؛	»			ŧ	ป	»	Ṡ	»	
1011 1100	274	188	BC	¼	ź	ĵ	ŧ	М		Ό	¼		ž	ผ	¼	ỳ	Œ	
1011 1101	275	189	BD	½	˝	½	Ŋ	Н		½			―	ฝ	½	Ẅ	œ	
1011 1110	276	190	BE	¾	ž		ž	О		Ύ	¾		ū	พ	¾	ẅ	Ÿ	
1011 1111	277	191	BF	¿	ż		ŋ	П	؟	Ώ		¿	ŋ	ฟ	æ	ṡ	¿	ż
1100 0000	300	192	C0	À	Ŕ	À	Ā	Р		ΐ		À	Ā	ภ	Ą	À		
1100 0001	301	193	C1	Á				С	ء	Α		Á		ม	Į	Á		
1100 0010	302	194	C2	Â				Т	آ	Β		Â		ย	Ā	Â		
1100 0011	303	195	C3	Ã	Ă		Ã	У	أ	Γ		Ã		ร	Ć	Ã		Ă
1100 0100	304	196	C4	Ä				Ф	ؤ	Δ		Ä		ฤ	Ä			
1100 0101	305	197	C5	Å	Ĺ	Ċ	Å	Х	إ	Ε		Å		ล	Å			Ć
1100 0110	306	198	C6	Æ	Ć	Ĉ	Æ	Ц	ئ	Ζ		Æ		ฦ	Ę	Æ		
1100 0111	307	199	C7	Ç			Į	Ч	ا	Η		Ç	Į	ว	Ē	Ç		
1100 1000	310	200	C8	È	Č	È	Č	Ш	ب	Θ		È	Č	ศ	Č	È		
1100 1001	311	201	C9	É				Щ	ة	Ι		É		ษ	É			
1100 1010	312	202	CA	Ê	Ę	Ê	Ę	Ъ	ت	Κ		Ê	Ę	ส	Ź	Ê		
1100 1011	313	203	CB	Ë				Ы	ث	Λ		Ë		ห	Ė	Ë		
1100 1100	314	204	CC	Ì	Ě	Ì	Ė	Ь	ج	Μ		Ì	Ė	ฬ	Ģ	Ì		
1100 1101	315	205	CD	Í				Э	ح	Ν		Í		อ	Ķ	Í		
1100 1110	316	206	CE	Î				Ю	خ	Ξ		Î		ฮ	Ī	Î		
1100 1111	317	207	CF	Ï	Ď	Ï	Ī	Я	د	Ο		Ï		ฯ	Ļ	Ï		
Binary	Oct	Dec	Hex	1	2	3	4	5	6	7	8	9	10	11	13	14	15	16
1101 0000	320	208	D0	Ð	Đ		Đ	а	ذ	Π		Ğ	Ð	ะ	Š	Ŵ	Ð	
1101 0001	321	209	D1	Ñ	Ń	Ñ	Ņ	б	ر	Ρ		Ñ	Ņ	ั	Ń	Ñ		Ń
1101 0010	322	210	D2	Ò	Ň	Ò	Ō	в	ز			Ò	Ō	า	Ņ	Ò		
1101 0011	323	211	D3	Ó			Ķ	г	س	Σ		Ó		ำ	Ó			
1101 0100	324	212	D4	Ô				д	ش	Τ		Ô		ิ	Ō	Ô		
1101 0101	325	213	D5	Õ	Ő	Ġ	Õ	е	ص	Υ		Õ		ี	Õ			Ő
1101 0110	326	214	D6	Ö				ж	ض	Φ		Ö		ึ	Ö			
1101 0111	327	215	D7	×				з	ط	Χ		×	Ũ	ื	×	Ṫ	×	Ś
1101 1000	330	216	D8	Ø	Ř	Ĝ	Ø	и	ظ	Ψ		Ø		ุ	Ų	Ø		Ű
1101 1001	331	217	D9	Ù	Ů	Ù	Ų	й	ع	Ω		Ù	Ų	ู	Ł	Ù		
1101 1010	332	218	DA	Ú				к	غ	Ϊ		Ú		ฺ	Ś	Ú		
1101 1011	333	219	DB	Û	Ű	Û		л		Ϋ		Û			Ū	Û		
1101 1100	334	220	DC	Ü				м		ά		Ü			Ü			
1101 1101	335	221	DD	Ý		Ŭ	Ũ	н		έ		İ	Ý		Ż	Ý		Ę
1101 1110	336	222	DE	Þ	Ţ	Ŝ	Ū	о		ή		Ş	Þ		Ž	Ŷ	Þ	Ț
1101 1111	337	223	DF	ß				п		ί	‗	ß		฿	ß			
1110 0000	340	224	E0	à	ŕ	à	ā	р	ـ	ΰ	א	à	ā	เ	ą	à		
1110 0001	341	225	E1	á				с	ف	α	ב	á		แ	į	á		
1110 0010	342	226	E2	â				т	ق	β	ג	â		โ	ā	â		
1110 0011	343	227	E3	ã	ă		ã	у	ك	γ	ד	ã		ใ	ć	ã		ă
1110 0100	344	228	E4	ä				ф	ل	δ	ה	ä		ไ	ä			
1110 0101	345	229	E5	å	ĺ	ċ	å	х	م	ε	ו	å		ๅ	å			ć
1110 0110	346	230	E6	æ	ć	ĉ	æ	ц	ن	ζ	ז	æ		ๆ	ę	æ		
1110 0111	347	231	E7	ç			į	ч	ه	η	ח	ç	į	็	ē	ç		
1110 1000	350	232	E8	è	č	è	č	ш	و	θ	ט	è	č	่	č	è		
1110 1001	351	233	E9	é				щ	ى	ι	י	é		้	é			
1110 1010	352	234	EA	ê	ę	ê	ę	ъ	ي	κ	ך	ê	ę	๊	ź	ê		
1110 1011	353	235	EB	ë				ы	ً	λ	כ	ë		๋	ė	ë		
1110 1100	354	236	EC	ì	ě	ì	ė	ь	ٌ	μ	ל	ì	ė	์	ģ	ì		
1110 1101	355	237	ED	í				э	ٍ	ν	ם	í		ํ	ķ	í		
1110 1110	356	238	EE	î				ю	َ	ξ	מ	î		๎	ī	î		
1110 1111	357	239	EF	ï	ď	ï	ī	я	ُ	ο	ן	ï		๏	ļ	ï		
1111 0000	360	240	F0	ð	đ		đ	№	ِ	π	נ	ğ	ð	๐	š	ŵ	ð	đ
1111 0001	361	241	F1	ñ	ń	ñ	ņ	ё	ّ	ρ	ס	ñ	ņ	๑	ń	ñ		ń
1111 0010	362	242	F2	ò	ň	ò	ō	ђ	ْ	ς	ע	ò	ō	๒	ņ	ò		
1111 0011	363	243	F3	ó			ķ	ѓ		σ	ף	ó		๓	ó			
1111 0100	364	244	F4	ô				є		τ	פ	ô		๔	ō	ô		
1111 0101	365	245	F5	õ	ő	ġ	õ	ѕ		υ	ץ	õ		๕	õ			ő
1111 0110	366	246	F6	ö				і		φ	צ	ö		๖	ö			
1111 0111	367	247	F7	÷				ї		χ	ק	÷	ũ	๗	÷	ṫ	÷	ś
1111 1000	370	248	F8	ø	ř	ĝ	ø	ј		ψ	ר	ø		๘	ų	ø		ű
1111 1001	371	249	F9	ù	ů	ù	ų	љ		ω	ש	ù	ų	๙	ł	ù		
1111 1010	372	250	FA	ú				њ		ϊ	ת	ú		๚	ś	ú		
1111 1011	373	251	FB	û	ű	û		ћ		ϋ		û		๛	ū	û		
1111 1100	374	252	FC	ü				ќ		ό		ü			ü			
1111 1101	375	253	FD	ý		ŭ	ũ	§		ύ	LRM	ı	ý		ż	ý		ę
1111 1110	376	254	FE	þ	ţ	ŝ	ū	ў		ώ	RLM	ş	þ		ž	ŷ	þ	ț
1111 1111	377	255	FF	ÿ	˙			џ				ÿ	ĸ		’	ÿ		
Binary	Oct	Dec	Hex	1	2	3	4	5	6	7	8	9	10	11	13	14	15	16

unassigned code points.
new additions in ISO/IEC 8859-7:2003 and ISO/IEC 8859-8:1999 versions, previously unassigned.

== Relationship to Unicode and the UCS ==
Since 1991, the Unicode Consortium has been working with ISO and IEC to develop the Unicode Standard and ISO/IEC 10646: the Universal Character Set (UCS) in tandem. Newer editions of ISO/IEC 8859 express characters in terms of their Unicode/UCS names and the U+nnnn notation, effectively causing each part of ISO/IEC 8859 to be a Unicode/UCS character encoding scheme that maps a very small subset of the UCS to single 8-bit bytes. The first 256 characters in Unicode and the UCS are identical to those in ISO/IEC-8859-1 (Latin-1).

Single-byte character sets including the parts of ISO/IEC 8859 and derivatives of them were favoured throughout the 1990s, having the advantages of being well-established and more easily implemented in software: the equation of one byte to one character is simple and adequate for most single-language applications, and there are no combining characters or variant forms. As Unicode-enabled operating systems became more widespread, ISO/IEC 8859 and other legacy encodings became less popular. While remnants of ISO 8859 and single-byte character models remain entrenched in many operating systems, programming languages, data storage systems, networking applications, display hardware, and end-user application software, most modern computing applications use Unicode internally, and rely on conversion tables to map to and from other encodings, when necessary.

== Current status ==
The ISO/IEC 8859 standard was maintained by ISO/IEC Joint Technical Committee 1, Subcommittee 2, Working Group 3 (ISO/IEC JTC 1/SC 2/WG 3). In June 2004, WG 3 disbanded, and maintenance duties were transferred to SC 2. The standard is not currently being updated, as the Subcommittee's only remaining working group, WG 2, is concentrating on development of Unicode's Universal Coded Character Set.

The WHATWG Encoding Standard, which specifies the character encodings permitted in HTML5 which compliant browsers must support, includes most parts of ISO/IEC 8859, except for parts 1, 9 and 11, which are instead interpreted as Windows-1252, Windows-1254 and Windows-874 respectively. Authors of new pages and the designers of new protocols are instructed to use UTF-8 instead.

== See also ==
- List of information system character sets
- Number Forms
- RPL character set (an ISO/IEC 8859-1 superset on HP calculators, referred to as "ECMA-94" as well)
- DEC Multinational Character Set (MCS)
- DEC National Replacement Character Set (NRCS)
