= Windows-1257 =

Windows character set for Baltic languages

- MIME / IANA: windows-1257
- Alias(es): cp1257 (Code page 1257)
- Languages: Estonian, Latvian, Lithuanian, Latgalian, (also supports Polish, Slovene, Swedish, Finnish, Norwegian, Danish, German, English, Māori, Rotokas, Hawaiian, Niuean, Samoan, Tokelauan, Tongan, Tuvaluan, Hepburn romanization/Japanese transliteration, Persian transliteration)
- Created by: Microsoft
- Standard: LST 1590-3, WHATWG Encoding Standard
- Classification: extended ASCII, Windows-125x
- Other related encodings: IBM-922, ISO 8859-13, LST 1590-4

Windows-1257 (Windows Baltic) is an 8-bit, single-byte extended ASCII code page used to support the Estonian (which also used Windows-1252), Latvian and Lithuanian languages under Microsoft Windows. In Lithuania, it is standardised as LST 1590-3, alongside a modified variant named LST 1590-4.

The label Windows-1257 was registered with IANA in 1996, citing a publication of the specification in 1995 and inclusion with pan-European versions of Windows 95. The later ISO 8859-13 encoding (first published in 1998) is similar, but differs in reserving the range 0x80–9F for control characters, and accordingly locating certain quotation marks at codepoints 0xA1, 0xA5, 0xB4 and 0xFF instead (the latter two are used for spacing diacritics in Windows-1257). Windows-1257 is not compatible with the older ISO 8859-4 and ISO 8859-10 encodings. For the letters of the Estonian alphabet, Windows-1257 is compatible with IBM-922.

IBM uses code page 1257 (CCSID 1257, euro sign extended CCSID 5353, and the further extended CCSID 9449) for Windows-1257.

As with many other code pages, the languages supported in this code page can be supported in other code pages. The Estonian language can be written with Windows-1252. It is possible, but unusual, to write Polish, Slovene, Swedish, Finnish, Norwegian, Danish and German using this code page. The German specific characters will be identical to those encoded in Windows-1252.

Unicode is preferred to Windows-1257 in modern applications.

== Character set ==
The following table shows Windows-1257. Each character is shown with its Unicode equivalent in the tooltip.

Windows-1257
	0	1	2	3	4	5	6	7	8	9	A	B	C	D	E	F
0x	NUL	SOH	STX	ETX	EOT	ENQ	ACK	BEL	BS	HT	LF	VT	FF	CR	SO	SI
1x	DLE	DC1	DC2	DC3	DC4	NAK	SYN	ETB	CAN	EM	SUB	ESC	FS	GS	RS	US
2x	SP	!	"	#	$	%	&	'	(	)	*	+	,	-	.	/
3x	0	1	2	3	4	5	6	7	8	9	:	;	<	=	>	?
4x	@	A	B	C	D	E	F	G	H	I	J	K	L	M	N	O
5x	P	Q	R	S	T	U	V	W	X	Y	Z	[	\	]		_
6x	`	a	b	c	d	e	f	g	h	i	j	k	l	m	n	o
7x	p	q	r	s	t	u	v	w	x	y	z	{	|	}	~	DEL
8x	€		‚		„	…	†	‡		‰		‹		¨	ˇ	¸
9x		‘	’	“	”	•	–	—		™		›		¯	˛	
Ax	NBSP		¢	£	¤		¦	§	Ø	©	Ŗ	«	¬	SHY	®	Æ
Bx	°	±	²	³	´	µ	¶	·	ø	¹	ŗ	»	¼	½	¾	æ
Cx	Ą	Į	Ā	Ć	Ä	Å	Ę	Ē	Č	É	Ź	Ė	Ģ	Ķ	Ī	Ļ
Dx	Š	Ń	Ņ	Ó	Ō	Õ	Ö	×	Ų	Ł	Ś	Ū	Ü	Ż	Ž	ß
Ex	ą	į	ā	ć	ä	å	ę	ē	č	é	ź	ė	ģ	ķ	ī	ļ
Fx	š	ń	ņ	ó	ō	õ	ö	÷	ų	ł	ś	ū	ü	ż	ž	˙

Unassigned
Differences from Windows-1252
