= Mac OS Central European encoding =

Character encoding on Macintosh computers

Mac OS Central European
- Alias(es): x-mac-ce, Code page 10029
- Languages: Czech, Slovak, Hungarian, Polish, Estonian, Latvian, Lithuanian
- Created by: Apple, Inc.
- Classification: Extended ASCII, Mac OS script
- Extends: US-ASCII
- Based on: Mac OS Roman

Mac OS Central European is a character encoding used on Apple Macintosh computers to represent texts in Central European and Southeastern European languages that use the Latin script. This encoding is also known as Code Page 10029. IBM assigns code page/CCSID 1282 to this encoding. This codepage contains diacritical letters that ISO 8859-2 does not have, and vice versa (This encoding supports Estonian, Lithuanian and Latvian while ISO 8859-2 supports Albanian, Croatian and Romanian).

Although a few of the characters which are in Mac OS Central European but not Mac OS Roman are also supported by Mac OS Croatian, these are not encoded at the same positions.

== Code page layout ==
The following table shows the Macintosh Central European encoding. Each character is shown with its equivalent Unicode code point. Only the second half of the table (code points 128–255) is shown, the first half (code points 0–127) being the same as MacRoman or ASCII.

Mac OS Central European
	0	1	2	3	4	5	6	7	8	9	A	B	C	D	E	F
8x	Ä	Ā	ā	É	Ą	Ö	Ü	á	ą	Č	ä	č	Ć	ć	é	Ź
9x	ź	Ď	í	ď	Ē	ē	Ė	ó	ė	ô	ö	õ	ú	Ě	ě	ü
Ax	†	°	Ę	£	§	•	¶	ß	®	©	™	ę	¨	≠	ģ	Į
Bx	į	Ī	≤	≥	ī	Ķ	∂	∑	ł	Ļ	ļ	Ľ	ľ	Ĺ	ĺ	Ņ
Cx	ņ	Ń	¬	√	ń	Ň	∆	«	»	…	NBSP	ň	Ő	Õ	ő	Ō
Dx	–	—	“	”	‘	’	÷	◊	ō	Ŕ	ŕ	Ř	‹	›	ř	Ŗ
Ex	ŗ	Š	‚	„	š	Ś	ś	Á	Ť	ť	Í	Ž	ž	Ū	Ó	Ô
Fx	ū	Ů	Ú	ů	Ű	ű	Ų	ų	Ý	ý	ķ	Ż	Ł	ż	Ģ	ˇ

Differences from MacRoman
