= ISO/IEC 10367 =

Standard specifying graphical character sets

ISO/IEC 10367:1991 is a standard developed by ISO/IEC JTC 1/SC 2, defining graphical character sets for use in character encodings implementing levels 2 and 3 of ISO/IEC 4873 (as opposed to ISO/IEC 8859, which defines character encodings at level 1 of ISO/IEC 4873).

== Relationship to ISO/IEC 8859 ==
The parts of ISO/IEC 8859 define complete encodings at level 1 of ISO/IEC 4873 (i.e., as stateless extended ASCII single-byte encodings, reserving the C1 area), and do not allow for use of multiple parts together. For use at levels 2 and 3 of ISO/IEC 4873 (i.e., with shift codes for additional graphical character sets), ISO/IEC 8859 stipulates that equivalent sets from ISO/IEC 10367 should be used instead.

ISO/IEC 10367:1991 includes ASCII, as well as sets matching the G1 sets used for the right-hand sides (non-ASCII parts) of ISO/IEC 6937 (ITU T.51) and of ISO/IEC 8859 parts 1 through 9 (i.e., those parts that existed as of 1991, when it was published), a set of additional Roman characters supplementing some of those parts, and a set of box drawing characters (shown below).

== Supplementary G3 Latin set ==
ISO/IEC 10367 includes the ISO-IR-154 graphical set, which is intended to supplement Latin alphabets number 1, 2 and 5 (i.e., ISO-8859-1, ISO-8859-2 and ISO-8859-9). Specifically, it is intended for use as a G3 set in a profile of ISO/IEC 4873 in which the G1 and G2 sets include the right hand side of ISO-8859-2, and also that of either ISO-8859-1 or ISO-8859-9. These configurations represent the entire ISO/IEC 6937 repertoire (ITU T.51 Annex A) without non-spacing codes.

For instance, the letter Ĉ would be encoded under ISO/IEC 4873 level 2 as 0x8F 0x23 if this set is included.

Highlighted characters also appear in ISO-8859-1 or ISO-8859-9. Under the current edition of ISO/IEC 4873 / ECMA-43 (though not earlier editions), characters must be used from the lowest-numbered working set they appear in, hence those characters are not used from this G3 set when the respective ISO-8859 right-hand side set is used as the G1 or G2 set.

ISO/IEC 10367 supplementary G3 Latin set
	0	1	2	3	4	5	6	7	8	9	A	B	C	D	E	F
2x/Ax			Ā	Ĉ	Ċ		Ė	Ē	Ĝ	‘	“	™	←	↑	→	↓
3x/Bx			ā	ĉ	ċ	ð	ė	ē	ĝ	’	”	♪	⅛	⅜	⅝	⅞
4x/Cx		Ğ	Ġ	Ģ	Ĥ	Ħ	Ĩ	İ	Ī	Į	Ĳ	Ĵ	Ķ	Ļ	Ŀ	Ņ
5x/Dx	—	Ŋ	Ō	Œ	Ŗ	Ŝ	Ŧ	Þ	Ũ	Ŭ	Ū	Ų	Ŵ	Ý	Ŷ	Ÿ
6x/Ex	Ω	ğ	ġ	ģ	ĥ	ħ	ĩ	ı	ī	į	ĳ	ĵ	ķ	ļ	ŀ	ņ
7x/Fx	ĸ	ŋ	ō	œ	ŗ	ŝ	ŧ	þ	ũ	ŭ	ū	ų	ŵ	ý	ŷ	ŉ

Also in ISO-8859-1
Also in ISO-8859-9

== Box drawing set ==
The following shows the box drawing set from ISO/IEC 10367, which is registered for ISO/IEC 2022 use as ISO-IR-155. It does not use the 0x20/A0 or 0x7F/FF positions, but is nonetheless registered as a 96-character set.

Perl libintl includes a "ISO_10367-BOX" codec. This encodes/decodes ASCII over GL and the ISO-IR-155 box drawing set over GR with a few deviations. Specifically, it includes double-lined box-drawing characters in place of heavy-lined characters, and it replaces the upper half block (▀) at 0xCB with a private use character U+E019, documented as "Unit space B".

ISO/IEC 10367 box drawing set
	0	1	2	3	4	5	6	7	8	9	A	B	C	D	E	F
2x/Ax																
3x/Bx																
4x/Cx	┃	━	┏	┓	┗	┛	┣	┫	┳	┻	╋	▀	▄	█	▪	
5x/Dx	│	─	┌	┐	└	┘	├	┤	┬	┴	┼	░	▒	▓		
6x/Ex																
7x/Fx																
