= ISO/IEC 8859-13 =

Single byte character encoding for Baltic languages

- MIME / IANA: ISO-8859-13
- Alias(es): iso-ir-179, l7, csISOLatin7, latin7
- Language: Baltic languages
- Standard: ISO/IEC 8859
- Classification: ISO 8859 (extended ASCII, ISO 4873 level 1)
- Extends: US-ASCII
- Based on: Windows-1257 (LST 1590-3)
- Other related encodings: LST 1590-4, IBM-922

ISO/IEC 8859-13:1998, Information technology — 8-bit single-byte coded graphic character sets — Part 13: Latin alphabet No. 7, is part of the ISO/IEC 8859 series of ASCII-based standard character encodings, first edition published in 1998. It is informally referred to as Latin-7 or Baltic Rim. It was designed to cover the Baltic languages, and added characters used in Polish missing from the earlier encodings ISO 8859-4 and ISO 8859-10. Unlike these two, it does not cover the Nordic languages. It is similar to the earlier-published Windows-1257; its encoding of the Estonian alphabet also matches IBM-922. This is also known as Latvian standard LVS 8.

ISO-8859-13 is the IANA preferred charset name for this standard when supplemented with the C0 and C1 control codes from ISO/IEC 6429.

Microsoft has assigned code page 28603 a.k.a. Windows-28603 to ISO-8859-13. IBM has assigned code page 921 to ISO-8859-13 until that code page was extended. ISO-IR 206 (code page 901, later extended) replaces the currency sign at position A4 with the euro sign (€).

== Code page layout ==
Differences from ISO-8859-1 have the Unicode code point number below the character.

ISO/IEC 8859-13
| | 0 | 1 | 2 | 3 | 4 | 5 | 6 | 7 | 8 | 9 | A | B | C | D | E | F |
|---|---|---|---|---|---|---|---|---|---|---|---|---|---|---|---|---|
| 0x | | | | | | | | | | | | | | | | |
| 1x | | | | | | | | | | | | | | | | |
| 2x | SP | ! | " | # | $ | % | & | ' | ( | ) | * | + | , | - | . | / |
| 3x | 0 | 1 | 2 | 3 | 4 | 5 | 6 | 7 | 8 | 9 | : | ; | < | = | > | ? |
| 4x | @ | A | B | C | D | E | F | G | H | I | J | K | L | M | N | O |
| 5x | P | Q | R | S | T | U | V | W | X | Y | Z | [ | \ | ] | | _ |
| 6x | ` | a | b | c | d | e | f | g | h | i | j | k | l | m | n | o |
| 7x | p | q | r | s | t | u | v | w | x | y | z | { | | | } | ~ | |
| 8x | | | | | | | | | | | | | | | | |
| 9x | | | | | | | | | | | | | | | | |
| Ax | NBSP | ” 201D | ¢ | £ | ¤ | „ 201E | ¦ | § | Ø 00D8 | © | Ŗ 0156 | « | ¬ | SHY | ® | Æ 00C6 |
| Bx | ° | ± | ² | ³ | “ 201C | µ | ¶ | · | ø 00F8 | ¹ | ŗ 0157 | » | ¼ | ½ | ¾ | æ 00E6 |
| Cx | Ą 0104 | Į 012E | Ā 0100 | Ć 0106 | Ä | Å | Ę 0118 | Ē 0112 | Č 010C | É | Ź 0179 | Ė 0116 | Ģ 0122 | Ķ 0136 | Ī 012A | Ļ 013B |
| Dx | Š 0160 | Ń 0143 | Ņ 0145 | Ó | Ō 014C | Õ | Ö | × | Ų 0172 | Ł 0141 | Ś 015A | Ū 016A | Ü | Ż 017B | Ž 017D | ß |
| Ex | ą 0105 | į 012F | ā 0101 | ć 0107 | ä | å | ę 0119 | ē 0113 | č 010D | é | ź 017A | ė 0117 | ģ 0123 | ķ 0137 | ī 012B | ļ 013C |
| Fx | š 0161 | ń 0144 | ņ 0146 | ó | ō 014D | õ | ö | ÷ | ų 0173 | ł 0142 | ś 015B | ū 016B | ü | ż 017C | ž 017E | ’ 2019 |
