= Code page 921 =

Computer character set for Baltic languages

Code page 921 (CCSID 921) (also known as CP 921, IBM 00921) is a code page used under IBM AIX and DOS to write the Estonian, Latvian, and Lithuanian languages. It is an extension of ISO/IEC 8859-13. The original code page matched ISO/IEC 8859-13 directly.

Code page 901 (CCSID 901) replaces the currency sign (¤) at position 0xA4 with the euro sign (€).

== Code page layout ==
In the following table characters are shown together with their corresponding Unicode code points.

Code page 921
	0	1	2	3	4	5	6	7	8	9	A	B	C	D	E	F
0x		☺	☻	♥	♦	♣	♠	•	◘	○	◙	♂	♀	♪	♫	☼
1x	►	◄	↕	‼	¶	§	▬	↨	↑	↓	→	←	∟	↔	▲	▼
2x	SP	!	"	#	$	%	&	'	(	)	*	+	,	-	.	/
3x	0	1	2	3	4	5	6	7	8	9	:	;	<	=	>	?
4x	@	A	B	C	D	E	F	G	H	I	J	K	L	M	N	O
5x	P	Q	R	S	T	U	V	W	X	Y	Z	[	\	]		_
6x	`	a	b	c	d	e	f	g	h	i	j	k	l	m	n	o
7x	p	q	r	s	t	u	v	w	x	y	z	{	|	}	~	
8x	░	▒	▓	│	┤	┘	┌	█	▄	╣	║	╗	╝	▀	¥	┐
9x	└	┴	┬	├	─	┼	■	‗	╚	╔	╩	╦	╠	═	╬	¯
Ax	NBSP	”	¢	£	¤	„	¦	§	Ø	©	Ŗ	«	¬	SHY	®	Æ
Bx	°	±	²	³	“	µ	¶	·	ø	¹	ŗ	»	¼	½	¾	æ
Cx	Ą	Į	Ā	Ć	Ä	Å	Ę	Ē	Č	É	Ź	Ė	Ģ	Ķ	Ī	Ļ
Dx	Š	Ń	Ņ	Ó	Ō	Õ	Ö	×	Ų	Ł	Ś	Ū	Ü	Ż	Ž	ß
Ex	ą	į	ā	ć	ä	å	ę	ē	č	é	ź	ė	ģ	ķ	ī	ļ
Fx	š	ń	ņ	ó	ō	õ	ö	÷	ų	ł	ś	ū	ü	ż	ž	’
