= ISO/IEC 8859-10 =

8-bit character encoding

- MIME / IANA: ISO-8859-10
- Alias(es): iso-ir-157, l6, csISOLatin6, latin6
- Language: Nordic languages
- Standard: ECMA-144, ISO/IEC 8859
- Classification: ISO 8859 (extended ASCII, ISO 4873 level 1)
- Extends: US-ASCII
- Based on: ISO-8859-1, ISO-8859-4

ISO/IEC 8859-10:1998, Information technology — 8-bit single-byte coded graphic character sets — Part 10: Latin alphabet No. 6, is part of the ISO/IEC 8859 series of ASCII-based standard character encodings, first edition published in 1992. It is informally referred to as Latin-6. It was designed to cover the Nordic languages, deemed of more use for them than ISO 8859-4.

ISO-8859-10 is the IANA preferred charset name for this standard when supplemented with the C0 and C1 control codes from ISO/IEC 6429. Microsoft has assigned code page 28600 a.k.a. Windows-28600 to ISO-8859-10 in Windows. IBM has assigned Code page 919 to ISO-8859-10. It is published by Ecma International as ECMA-144.

== Code page layout ==
Differences from ISO-8859-1 have the Unicode code point number below the character.

ISO/IEC 8859-10 (Latin-6)
	0	1	2	3	4	5	6	7	8	9	A	B	C	D	E	F
0x																
1x																
2x	SP	!	"	#	$	%	&	'	(	)	*	+	,	-	.	/
3x	0	1	2	3	4	5	6	7	8	9	:	;	<	=	>	?
4x	@	A	B	C	D	E	F	G	H	I	J	K	L	M	N	O
5x	P	Q	R	S	T	U	V	W	X	Y	Z	[	\	]		_
6x	`	a	b	c	d	e	f	g	h	i	j	k	l	m	n	o
7x	p	q	r	s	t	u	v	w	x	y	z	{	|	}	~	
8x																
9x																
Ax	NBSP	Ą 0104	Ē 0112	Ģ 0122	Ī 012A	Ĩ 0128	Ķ 0136	§	Ļ 013B	Đ 0110	Š 0160	Ŧ 0166	Ž 017D	SHY	Ū 016A	Ŋ 014A
Bx	°	ą 0105	ē 0113	ģ 0123	ī 012B	ĩ 0129	ķ 0137	·	ļ 013C	đ 0111	š 0161	ŧ 0167	ž 017E	― 2015	ū 016B	ŋ 014B
Cx	Ā 0100	Á	Â	Ã	Ä	Å	Æ	Į 012E	Č 010C	É	Ę 0118	Ë	Ė 0116	Í	Î	Ï
Dx	Ð	Ņ 0145	Ō 014C	Ó	Ô	Õ	Ö	Ũ 0168	Ø	Ų 0172	Ú	Û	Ü	Ý	Þ	ß
Ex	ā 0101	á	â	ã	ä	å	æ	į 012F	č 010D	é	ę 0119	ë	ė 0117	í	î	ï
Fx	ð	ņ 0146	ō 014D	ó	ô	õ	ö	ũ 0169	ø	ų 0173	ú	û	ü	ý	þ	ĸ 0138

== ISO-IR 158 code page layout ==
ISO-IR 158 is a supplementary ISO 2022 graphical set, containing characters which are absent in ISO-8859-10, but which are required for writing Skolt Sami or historic Sami orthographies. It is intended to be used in an ISO 4873 profile for Sami languages, as a G2 or G3 set (i.e. prefixed with 0x8E/SS2 or 0x8F/SS3 respectively) alongside the main Latin-6 (ISO 8859-10) G1 set. ISO-IR-158 and ISO-IR-197 are both referenced in an informative ISO 8859 annex as allowing for a more adequate coverage of the orthography of certain Sámi languages such as Skolt Sámi than ISO-8859-4 or plain ISO-8859-10.

The code chart gives a symbol used in older orthographies to denote an aspirated consonant, usually written as a reversed apostrophe or raised left-half ring, the unusual name of "high ogonek". The table below shows the additional graphical set.

ISO-IR 158 (prefixed with 0x8E or 0x8F)
	0	1	2	3	4	5	6	7	8	9	A	B	C	D	E	F
2x	´															
3x	ʽ															
4x	Ă	À	Ǟ	Ǡ	Ǣ	Ĕ	È	Ǥ	Ǧ	Ǩ	Ŏ	Ò	Ǫ	Ǭ	Ʒ	Ǯ
5x																
6x	ă	à	ǟ	ǡ	ǣ	ĕ	è	ǥ	ǧ	ǩ	ŏ	ò	ǫ	ǭ	ʒ	ǯ
7x																
