= ISO/IEC 8859-4 =

Part of the ISO/IEC 8859 series

- MIME / IANA: ISO-8859-4
- Alias(es): iso-ir-110, latin4, l4, csISOLatin4
- Standard: ECMA-94:1986, ISO/IEC 8859

ISO/IEC 8859-4:1998, Information technology — 8-bit single-byte coded graphic character sets — Part 4: Latin alphabet No. 4, is part of the ISO/IEC 8859 series of ASCII-based standard character encodings, first edition published in 1988. It is informally referred to as Latin-4 or North European. It was designed to cover Estonian, Latvian, Lithuanian, Greenlandic, and Sámi. It has been largely superseded by ISO/IEC 8859-10 and Unicode. Microsoft has assigned code page 28594 a.k.a. Windows-28594 to ISO-8859-4 in Windows. IBM has assigned code page 914 (CCSID 914) to ISO 8859-4.

ISO-8859-4 is the IANA preferred charset name for this standard when supplemented with the C0 and C1 control codes from ISO/IEC 6429. ISO-IR 205 (called Code page 58258 by FreeDOS) replaces the generic Currency Sign at 0xA4 with the Euro Sign.

== Code page layout ==
Differences from ISO-8859-1 have the Unicode code point below them.

ISO/IEC 8859-4
	0	1	2	3	4	5	6	7	8	9	A	B	C	D	E	F
0x																
1x																
2x	SP	!	"	#	$	%	&	'	(	)	*	+	,	-	.	/
3x	0	1	2	3	4	5	6	7	8	9	:	;	<	=	>	?
4x	@	A	B	C	D	E	F	G	H	I	J	K	L	M	N	O
5x	P	Q	R	S	T	U	V	W	X	Y	Z	[	\	]		_
6x	`	a	b	c	d	e	f	g	h	i	j	k	l	m	n	o
7x	p	q	r	s	t	u	v	w	x	y	z	{	|	}	~	
8x																
9x																
Ax	NBSP	Ą 0104	ĸ 0138	Ŗ 0156	¤	Ĩ 0128	Ļ 013B	§	¨	Š 0160	Ē 0112	Ģ 0122	Ŧ 0166	SHY	Ž 017D	¯
Bx	°	ą 0105	˛ 02DB	ŗ 0157	´	ĩ 0129	ļ 013C	ˇ 02C7	¸	š 0161	ē 0113	ģ 0123	ŧ 0167	Ŋ 014A	ž 017E	ŋ 014B
Cx	Ā 0100	Á	Â	Ã	Ä	Å	Æ	Į 012E	Č 010C	É	Ę 0118	Ë	Ė 0116	Í	Î	Ī 012A
Dx	Đ 0110	Ņ 0145	Ō 014C	Ķ 0136	Ô	Õ	Ö	×	Ø	Ų 0172	Ú	Û	Ü	Ũ 0168	Ū 016A	ß
Ex	ā 0101	á	â	ã	ä	å	æ	į 012F	č 010D	é	ę 0119	ë	ė 0117	í	î	ī 012B
Fx	đ 0111	ņ 0146	ō 014D	ķ 0137	ô	õ	ö	÷	ø	ų 0173	ú	û	ü	ũ 0169	ū 016B	˙ 02D9
