= Polish alphabet =

Script of the Polish language

Polish alphabet alfabet polski, abecadło
- Script type: Alphabet
- Languages: Polish

Related scripts
- Parent systems: Egyptian hieroglyphs: Proto-Sinaitic alphabet; Phoenician alphabet; Greek alphabet; Old Italic scripts; Latin alphabet; Polish alphabet

Unicode
- Unicode range: Subset of Latin

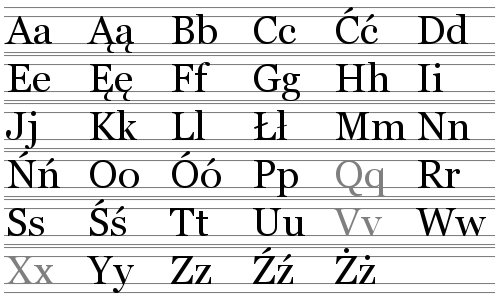
The Polish alphabet. Grey indicates letters not used in native words (Q, V, and X).

The Polish alphabet (Polish: alfabet polski, abecadło) is the script of the Polish language, the basis for the Polish system of orthography. It is based on the Latin alphabet but includes certain letters (9) with diacritics: the stroke (acute accent or bar) – kreska: ⟨ć, ł, ń, ó, ś, ź⟩; the overdot – kropka: ⟨ż⟩; and the tail or ogonek – ⟨ą, ę⟩. The letters ⟨q⟩, ⟨v⟩, and ⟨x⟩, which are used only in foreign words, are usually absent from the Polish alphabet. Additionally, before the standardization of Polish spelling, ⟨qu⟩ was sometimes used in place of ⟨kw⟩, and ⟨x⟩ in place of ⟨ks⟩.

Modified variations of the Polish alphabet are used for writing Silesian and Kashubian, whereas the Sorbian languages use a mixture of Polish and Czech orthography.

== Letters ==
There are 32 letters in the Polish alphabet: 9 vowels and 23 consonants.

⟨q⟩, ⟨v⟩, and ⟨x⟩ are not used in any native Polish words and are mostly found in foreign words (such as place names) and commercial names. In loanwords they are usually replaced by ⟨k⟩, (Note: The digraph ⟨qu⟩ is typically replaced by ⟨kw⟩.) ⟨w⟩, and ⟨ks⟩, respectively (as in nikab 'niqab', kwark 'quark', weranda 'veranda', sawanna 'savanna', ekstra 'extra', oksymoron 'oxymoron'), although some loanwords retain their original spelling (e.g., quiz, virga), and in a few cases both spellings are accepted (such as veto or weto, volt or wolt). In addition, they can occasionally be found in common abbreviations (e.g., ksiądz 'priest' can be abbreviated as either ⟨ks.⟩ or ⟨x.⟩). As a result, they are sometimes included in the Polish alphabet (bringing the total number of letters in the alphabet to 35). When included, they take their usual positions from the Latin alphabet (⟨q⟩ after ⟨p⟩; ⟨v⟩ and ⟨x⟩ either side of ⟨w⟩).

The following table lists the letters of the alphabet, their Polish names (see also Names of letters below), the Polish spelling alphabet name, the Polish phonemes which they usually represent (and rough equivalents for them), other possible pronunciations, and letter frequencies. Diacritics are shown for the sake of clarity. For more information about the sounds, see Polish phonology.

| Upper case | Lower case | Polish name | Usual value | Rough English (or other) equivalent | Other values |
|---|---|---|---|---|---|
| A | a | a | /ä/ | large | More frontal [a] between palatal or palatalized consonants |
| Ą | ą | ą | /ɔ̃w̃/ | nasal o, as French bon (Depends on where it is in the word) | [ɔn], [ɔŋ], [ɔm]; becomes /ɔ/ before /w/ (see Nasal vowels) |
| B | b | be | /b/ | bed | [p] when devoiced |
| C | c | ce | /t̪͡s̪/ | pits | [d̪͡z̪] if voiced. For ch, ci, cz see Digraphs |
| Ć | ć | cie | /t͡ɕ/ | cheap (alveolo-palatal) | [d͡ʑ] if voiced |
| D | d | de | /d̪/ | dog | [d̺] before /d͡ʐ/; [t̪] when devoiced; [t̺] before /t͡ʂ/. For dz etc. see Digraphs |
| E | e | e | /ɛ/ | bed | [e] between palatal or palatalized consonants |
| Ę | ę | ę | /ɛ̃w̃/ | nasal e, as French cinq (Also depends on where it is in the word) | [ɛn], [ɛŋ], [ɛm]; becomes /ɛ/ word-finally and before /w/ (see Nasal vowels) |
| F | f | ef | /f/ | fingers | [v] if voiced |
| G | g | gie | /ɡ/ | go | [k] when devoiced. For gi see Digraphs |
| H | h | ha | /x/ | Scots loch | [ɣ] if voiced, may be glottal [ɦ] in a small number of dialects. For ch and (c)hi see Digraphs |
| I | i | i | /i/ | meet | [j] before a consonant; marks palatization of the preceding consonant before a vowel (see Spelling rules) |
| J | j | jot | /j/ | yes | |
| K | k | ka | /k/ | king | [ɡ] if voiced. For ki see Digraphs |
| L | l | el | /l/ | light | May be [lʲ] instead in eastern dialects |
| Ł | ł | eł | /w/ | will | May be [ɫ̪] instead in eastern dialects |
| M | m | em | /m/ | men | [ɱ] before labiodental consonants |
| N | n | en | /n̪/ | not | [n̺] before /t͡ʂ d͡ʐ/; can be [ŋ] before /k ɡ/. For ni see Digraphs |
| Ń | ń | eń | /ɲ̟/ | canyon (alveolo-palatal) | Can be [j̃] in syllable coda |
| O | o | o | /ɔ/ | (for accents without the cot-caught merger) long | [o] between palatal or palatalized consonants |
| Ó | ó | ó, o z kreską, o kreskowane or u zamknięte | /u/ | boot | [ʉ] between palatal or palatalized consonants |
| P | p | pe | /p/ | spot | [b] if voiced |
| (Q) | (q) | ku | /k/ | question | Only in some traditional loanwords as quasi-, quorum, (where qu- is usually read as /kv/) and recent as quad, queer, quiz (where qu- is usually read as /kw/). |
| R | r | er | /r/ | American English butter | Can also sometimes be an approximant, a fricative, and – rarely – a trill. See Polish phonology. For rz see Digraphs |
| S | s | es | /s̪/ | sea | For sz, si see Digraphs |
| Ś | ś | eś | /ɕ/ | sheep (alveolo-palatal) | [ʑ] (cf. Ź) if voiced |
| T | t | te | /t̪/ | start | [t̺] before /t͡ʂ/; [d̪] if voiced; [d̺] before /d͡ʐ/. |
| U | u | u, u zwykłe or u otwarte | /u/ | boot | [ʉ] between palatal or palatalized consonants, sometimes [w] after vowels |
| (V) | (v) | fał | /v/ | vow | Only in some traditional loanwords as varsaviana, vademecum, vel, vide, recent as van, Vanuatu, vlog, some acronyms as TVP, VAT and in artistic forms, as vlepka, seldom as [f] in German borrowings as volkslista and as a Roman numeral 5. |
| W | w | wu | /v/ | vow | [f] when devoiced |
| (X) | (x) | iks | /ks/ | fox | Only in some loanwords as xenia, also historical letter for native words prior to 19th century, e.g., xiążę, xięstwo (now książę 'prince', księstwo 'duchy'), which remains in abbreviations of these words (sometimes used x. instead of ks.), some names, as Xymena, Xawery, surnames as Xiężopolski, Axentowicz, Axer, names of some companies in Poland with -ex suffix and as a Roman numeral 10. |
| Y | y | igrek | /ɨ/ | bit | |
| Z | z | zet | /z̪/ | zoo | [s̪] when devoiced. For digraphs see Digraphs |
| Ź | ź | ziet | /ʑ/ | vision (alveolo-palatal) | [ɕ] when devoiced. For dź see Digraphs |
| Ż | ż | żet or zet z kropką | /ʐ/ | vision | [ʂ] when devoiced. For dż see Digraphs |

For English speakers who end the word with a nasal vowel and not a consonant.
Sequences /t.t͡ʂ d.d͡ʐ/ may be pronounced as geminates [t͡ʂː d͡ʐː].
/ɨ/ is sometimes transcribed phonetically as ⟨ɪ⟩, though it is phonetically [ɘ̟].

⟨é⟩ was historically used in native words prior to the 1891 spelling reform by the Academy of Learning, e.g., cztéry, papiéż (now cztery 'four', papież 'pope'). Now it is used in some loanwords, e.g., attaché, exposé, chargé d’affaires.

For digraphs and other rules about spelling and the corresponding pronunciations, see Polish orthography.

== Names of letters ==
The spoken Polish names of the letters are given in the table under Letters above.

The names of the letters are not normally written out in the way shown above, except as part of certain lexicalized abbreviations, such as Pekao (or PeKaO), the name of a bank, which represents the spoken form of the abbreviation P.K.O. (for Polska Kasa Opieki).

Some letters may be referred to in alternative ways, often consisting of just the sound of the letter. For example, ⟨y⟩ may be called as it is pronounced: y rather than igrek (from 'Greek i').

When giving the spelling of words, certain letters may be said in more emphatic ways to distinguish them from other identically pronounced characters. For example, ⟨h⟩ may be referred to as samo ha ('h alone') to distinguish it from ⟨ch⟩ (ce ha). ⟨ż⟩ may be called żet z kropką or zet z kropką ('z with an overdot') to distinguish it from ⟨rz⟩ (er zet). ⟨u⟩ may be called u otwarte ('open u', a reference to its graphical form) or u zwykłe ('normal u') to distinguish it from ⟨ó⟩, which is sometimes called u zamknięte ('closed u') or ó kreskowane, o kreskowane, o z kreską ('dashed ó', 'dashed o', 'o with a dash').

== Alphabetical order ==
Polish alphabetical ordering uses the order of letters as in the table under Letters above.

Note that (unlike in languages such as French, Spanish, and German) Polish letters with diacritics are treated as fully independent letters in alphabetical ordering. For example, być comes after bycie. The accented letters also have their own sections in dictionaries (words beginning with ⟨ć⟩ are not usually listed under ⟨c⟩).

Digraphs are not given any special treatment in alphabetical ordering. For example, ⟨ch⟩ is treated simply as ⟨c⟩ followed by ⟨h⟩ and not as a single letter as in Czech.

== Computer encoding ==
There are several systems for encoding the Polish alphabet for computers. All letters of the Polish alphabet are included in Unicode (blocks Basic Latin, Latin-1 Supplement and Latin Extended-A), and thus Unicode-based encodings such as UTF-8 and UTF-16 can be used. The Polish alphabet is completely included in the Basic Multilingual Plane of Unicode. The standard 8-bit character encoding for the Polish alphabet is ISO 8859-2 (Latin-2), although both ISO 8859-13 (Latin-7) and ISO 8859-16 (Latin-10) encodings include glyphs of the Polish alphabet. Microsoft's format for encoding the Polish alphabet is Windows-1250.

The Polish letters which are not present in the English alphabet have the following HTML codes and Unicode codepoints:

| Upper case | Ą | Ć | Ę | Ł | Ń | Ó | Ś | Ź | Ż |
| HTML entity | &#260; &Aogon; | &#262; &Cacute; | &#280; &Eogon; | &#321; &Lstrok; | &#323; &Nacute; | &#211; &Oacute; | &#346; &Sacute; | &#377; &Zacute; | &#379; &Zdot; |
| Unicode | U+0104 | U+0106 | U+0118 | U+0141 | U+0143 | U+00D3 | U+015A | U+0179 | U+017B |
| TexPL | 129 | 130 | 134 | 138 | 139 | 211 | 145 | 153 | 155 |
| Result | Ą | Ć | Ę | Ł | Ń | Ó | Ś | Ź | Ż |

| Lower case | ą | ć | ę | ł | ń | ó | ś | ź | ż |
| HTML entity | &#261; &aogon; | &#263; &cacute; | &#281; &eogon; | &#322; &lstrok; | &#324; &nacute; | &#243; &oacute; | &#347; &sacute; | &#378; &zacute; | &#380; &zdot; |
| Unicode | U+0105 | U+0107 | U+0119 | U+0142 | U+0144 | U+00F3 | U+015B | U+017A | U+017C |
| TexPL | 161 | 162 | 166 | 170 | 171 | 243 | 145 | 177 | 185 |
| Result | ą | ć | ę | ł | ń | ó | ś | ź | ż |

For other encodings, see Polish code pages, but also Combining Diacritical Marks Unicode block.

A common test sentence containing all the Polish diacritic letters is the nonsensical Zażółć gęślą jaźń ('Yellow the ego with/of a gusle').

== See also ==
- Polish orthography
- Polish Braille
- Cyrillization of Polish under the Russian Empire
- Cyrillic transcriptions of Polish
- Polish manual alphabet
