= ISO/IEC 8859-16 =

ASCII-based standard character encoding

ISO 8859-16
- MIME / IANA: ISO-8859-16
- Alias(es): iso-ir-226, latin10, l10
- Languages: Albanian, Gaj's Latin alphabet (Croatian, Bosnian, Serbian), Hungarian, Polish, Romanian, Slovene (also French, German, Italian, Irish)
- Standard: SR 14111:1998, ISO/IEC 8859-16:2001
- Classification: ISO 8859 (extended ASCII, ISO 4873 level 1)
- Extends: US-ASCII
- Based on: ISO-8859-15, ISO-8859-2

ISO/IEC 8859-16:2001, Information technology — 8-bit single-byte coded graphic character sets — Part 16: Latin alphabet No. 10, is part of the ISO/IEC 8859 series of ASCII-based standard character encodings, first edition published in 2001. The same encoding was defined as Romanian Standard SR 14111 in 1998, named the "Romanian Character Set for Information Interchange". It is informally referred to as Latin-10 or South-Eastern European. It was designed to cover Albanian, Croatian, Hungarian, Polish, Romanian, Serbian and Slovenian, but also French, German, Italian and Irish Gaelic (new orthography).

ISO-8859-16 is the IANA preferred charset name for this standard when supplemented with the C0 and C1 control codes from ISO/IEC 6429. Microsoft has assigned code page 28606 a.k.a. Windows-28606 to ISO-8859-16. FreeDOS has assigned code page 65500 to ISO-8859-16.

Originally, ISO 8859-16 was proposed as a different encoding which was revised and renamed ISO 8859-0 by 1997, and is now ISO 8859-15 after a further revision.

It is based on ISO/IEC 8859-15 (Euro, Œ, Š, Ž, uppercase Ÿ) and partially on ISO/IEC 8859-2 (the Romanian-specific letters are placed according to it, but using S-comma and T-comma instead of cedilla).

== Code page layout ==
Differences from ISO-8859-1 have the Unicode code point number below the character.

ISO/IEC 8859-16
	0	1	2	3	4	5	6	7	8	9	A	B	C	D	E	F
0x																
1x																
2x	SP	!	"	#	$	%	&	'	(	)	*	+	,	-	.	/
3x	0	1	2	3	4	5	6	7	8	9	:	;	<	=	>	?
4x	@	A	B	C	D	E	F	G	H	I	J	K	L	M	N	O
5x	P	Q	R	S	T	U	V	W	X	Y	Z	[	\	]		_
6x	`	a	b	c	d	e	f	g	h	i	j	k	l	m	n	o
7x	p	q	r	s	t	u	v	w	x	y	z	{	|	}	~	
8x																
9x																
Ax	NBSP	Ą 0104	ą 0105	Ł 0141	€ 20AC	„ 201E	Š 0160	§	š 0161	©	Ș 0218	«	Ź 0179	SHY	ź 017A	Ż 017B
Bx	°	±	Č 010C	ł 0142	Ž 017D	” 201D	¶	·	ž 017E	č 010D	ș 0219	»	Œ 0152	œ 0153	Ÿ 0178	ż 017C
Cx	À	Á	Â	Ă 0102	Ä	Ć 0106	Æ	Ç	È	É	Ê	Ë	Ì	Í	Î	Ï
Dx	Đ 0110	Ń 0143	Ò	Ó	Ô	Ő 0150	Ö	Ś 015A	Ű 0170	Ù	Ú	Û	Ü	Ę 0118	Ț 021A	ß
Ex	à	á	â	ă 0103	ä	ć 0107	æ	ç	è	é	ê	ë	ì	í	î	ï
Fx	đ 0111	ń 0144	ò	ó	ô	ő 0151	ö	ś 015B	ű 0171	ù	ú	û	ü	ę 0119	ț 021B	ÿ
