= Latin-1 Supplement =

Unicode U+0080 until U+00FF

Latin-1 Supplement or C1 Controls and Latin-1 Supplement
- Range: U+0080..U+00FF (128 code points)
- Plane: BMP
- Scripts: Latin (64 char.); Common (64 char.)
- Major alphabets: French; German; Icelandic; Portuguese; Spanish
- Symbol sets: Punctuation; Mathematics; Currency
- Assigned: 128 code points 33 Control or Format
- Unused: 0 reserved code points
- Source standards: ISO/IEC 8859-1

Unicode Version History
- 1.0.0 (1991): 128 (+128)

Unicode documentation
- Code chart ∣ Web page

The Latin-1 Supplement (also called C1 Controls and Latin-1 Supplement) is the second Unicode block in the Unicode standard (the first being Basic Latin). It encodes the upper range of ISO 8859-1: 80 (U+0080) – FF (U+00FF). C1 Controls (0080–009F) are not graphic. This block ranges from U+0080 to U+00FF, contains 128 characters and includes the C1 controls, Latin-1 punctuation and symbols, 30 pairs of majuscule and minuscule accented Latin characters and 2 mathematical operators.

The C1 Controls and Latin-1 Supplement block has been included in its present form, with the same character repertoire since version 1.0 of the Unicode Standard. Its block name in Unicode 1.0 was simply Latin1.

== Character table ==
Code	Result	Windows-1252 C1 Control Symbol	Windows-1252 C1 Control Symbol (LaTeX)	LaTeX	Description	Acronym
C1 Controls
U+0080		€	$\euro$		Padding Character	PAD
U+0081					High Octet Preset	HOP
U+0082		‚	$,$		Break Permitted Here	BPH
U+0083		ƒ	$f$		No Break Here	NBH
U+0084		„	$,,$		Index	IND
U+0085		…	$...$		Next Line	NEL
U+0086		†	$\dagger$		Start of Selected Area	SSA
U+0087		‡	$\ddagger$		End of Selected Area	ESA
U+0088		ˆ	$\hat{}$		Character (Horizontal) Tabulation Set	HTS
U+0089		‰			Character (Horizontal) Tabulation with Justification	HTJ
U+008A		Š	$\check{S}$		Line (Vertical) Tabulation Set	LTS
U+008B		‹			Partial Line Forward (Down)	PLD
U+008C		Œ			Partial Line Backward (Up)	PLU
U+008D					Reverse Line Feed (Index)	RI
U+008E		Ž	$\check{Z}$		Single-Shift Two	SS2
U+008F					Single-Shift Three	SS3
U+0090					Device Control String	DCS
U+0091		‘	$\mbox{`}$		Private Use One	PU1
U+0092		’	$'$		Private Use Two	PU2
U+0093		“	$\mbox{``}$		Set Transmit State	STS
U+0094		”	$''$		Cancel Character	CCH
U+0095		•	$\bullet$		Message Waiting	MW
U+0096		–	$--$		Start of Protected Area	SPA
U+0097		—	$---$		End of Protected Area	EPA
U+0098		˜	$\tilde{}$		Start of String	SOS
U+0099		™	$^\mathrm{TM}$		Single Graphic Character Introducer	SGCI
U+009A		š	$\check{s}$		Single Character Introducer	SCI
U+009B		›			Control Sequence Introducer	CSI
U+009C		œ			String Terminator	ST
U+009D					Operating System Command	OSC
U+009E		ž	$\check{z}$		Private Message	PM
U+009F		Ÿ	$\ddot{Y}$		Application Program Command	APC
Latin-1 Punctuation and Symbols
U+00A0					Non-breaking space	NBSP
U+00A1	¡				Inverted exclamation mark	
U+00A2	¢				Cent sign	
U+00A3	£				Pound sign	
U+00A4	¤				Currency sign	
U+00A5	¥				Yen sign	
U+00A6	¦				Broken bar	
U+00A7	§			$\S$	Section sign	
U+00A8	¨			$\ddot{}$	Diaeresis	
U+00A9	©				Copyright sign	
U+00AA	ª			$\mathrm{^a}$	Feminine ordinal indicator	
U+00AB	«				Left-pointing double angle quotation mark	
U+00AC	¬			$\neg$	Not sign	
U+00AD					Soft hyphen	SHY
U+00AE	®				Registered sign	
U+00AF	¯			$\bar{}$	Macron	
U+00B0	°			$^\circ$	Degree symbol	
U+00B1	±			$\pm$	Plus-minus sign	
U+00B2	²			$^2$	Superscript two	
U+00B3	³			$^3$	Superscript three	
U+00B4	´			$\acute{}$	Acute accent	
U+00B5	µ			$\mu$	Micro sign	
U+00B6	¶			$\P$	Pilcrow sign	
U+00B7	·			$\cdot$	Middle dot	
U+00B8	¸				Cedilla	
U+00B9	¹			$^1$	Superscript one	
U+00BA	º			$\mathrm{^o}$	Masculine ordinal indicator	
U+00BB	»				Right-pointing double angle quotation mark	
U+00BC	¼			$\frac{1}{4}$	Vulgar fraction one quarter	
U+00BD	½			$\frac{1}{2}$	Vulgar fraction one half	
U+00BE	¾			$\frac{3}{4}$	Vulgar fraction three quarters	
U+00BF	¿				Inverted question mark	
Letters
U+00C0	À			$\grave{A}$	Latin Capital Letter A with grave	
U+00C1	Á			$\acute{A}$	Latin Capital letter A with acute	
U+00C2	Â			$\hat{A}$	Latin Capital letter A with circumflex	
U+00C3	Ã			$\tilde{A}$	Latin Capital letter A with tilde	
U+00C4	Ä			$\ddot{A}$	Latin Capital letter A with diaeresis	
U+00C5	Å			$\AA$	Latin Capital letter A with ring above	
U+00C6	Æ				Latin Capital letter AE	
U+00C7	Ç				Latin Capital letter C with cedilla	
U+00C8	È			$\grave{E}$	Latin Capital letter E with grave	
U+00C9	É			$\acute{E}$	Latin Capital letter E with acute	
U+00CA	Ê			$\hat{E}$	Latin Capital letter E with circumflex	
U+00CB	Ë			$\ddot{E}$	Latin Capital letter E with diaeresis	
U+00CC	Ì			$\grave{I}$	Latin Capital letter I with grave	
U+00CD	Í			$\acute{I}$	Latin Capital letter I with acute	
U+00CE	Î			$\hat{I}$	Latin Capital letter I with circumflex	
U+00CF	Ï			$\ddot{I}$	Latin Capital letter I with diaeresis	
U+00D0	Ð				Latin Capital letter Eth	
U+00D1	Ñ			$\tilde{N}$	Latin Capital letter N with tilde	
U+00D2	Ò			$\grave{O}$	Latin Capital letter O with grave	
U+00D3	Ó			$\acute{O}$	Latin Capital letter O with acute	
U+00D4	Ô			$\hat{O}$	Latin Capital letter O with circumflex	
U+00D5	Õ			$\tilde{O}$	Latin Capital letter O with tilde	
U+00D6	Ö			$\ddot{O}$	Latin Capital letter O with diaeresis	
Mathematical operator
U+00D7	×			$\times$	Multiplication sign	
Letters
U+00D8	Ø				Latin Capital letter O with stroke	
U+00D9	Ù			$\grave{U}$	Latin Capital letter U with grave	
U+00DA	Ú			$\acute{U}$	Latin Capital letter U with acute	
U+00DB	Û			$\hat{U}$	Latin Capital Letter U with circumflex	
U+00DC	Ü			$\ddot{U}$	Latin Capital Letter U with diaeresis	
U+00DD	Ý			$\acute{Y}$	Latin Capital Letter Y with acute	
U+00DE	Þ				Latin Capital Letter Thorn	
U+00DF	ß				Latin Small Letter sharp S	
U+00E0	à			$\grave{a}$	Latin Small Letter A with grave	
U+00E1	á			$\acute{a}$	Latin Small Letter A with acute	
U+00E2	â			$\hat{a}$	Latin Small Letter A with circumflex	
U+00E3	ã			$\tilde{a}$	Latin Small Letter A with tilde	
U+00E4	ä			$\ddot{a}$	Latin Small Letter A with diaeresis	
U+00E5	å				Latin Small Letter A with ring above	
U+00E6	æ				Latin Small Letter AE	
U+00E7	ç				Latin Small Letter C with cedilla	
U+00E8	è			$\grave{e}$	Latin Small Letter E with grave	
U+00E9	é			$\acute{e}$	Latin Small Letter E with acute	
U+00EA	ê			$\hat{e}$	Latin Small Letter E with circumflex	
U+00EB	ë			$\ddot{e}$	Latin Small Letter E with diaeresis	
U+00EC	ì			$\grave{\imath}$	Latin Small Letter I with grave	
U+00ED	í			$\acute{\imath}$	Latin Small Letter I with acute	
U+00EE	î			$\hat{\imath}$	Latin Small Letter I with circumflex	
U+00EF	ï			$\ddot{\imath}$	Latin Small Letter I with diaeresis	
U+00F0	ð				Latin Small Letter Eth	
U+00F1	ñ			$\tilde{n}$	Latin Small Letter N with tilde	
U+00F2	ò			$\grave{o}$	Latin Small Letter O with grave	
U+00F3	ó			$\acute{o}$	Latin Small Letter O with acute	
U+00F4	ô			$\hat{o}$	Latin Small Letter O with circumflex	
U+00F5	õ			$\tilde{o}$	Latin Small Letter O with tilde	
U+00F6	ö			$\ddot{o}$	Latin Small Letter O with diaeresis	
Mathematical operator
U+00F7	÷			$\div$	Division sign	
Letters
U+00F8	ø				Latin Small Letter O with stroke	
U+00F9	ù			$\grave{u}$	Latin Small Letter U with grave	
U+00FA	ú			$\acute{u}$	Latin Small Letter U with acute	
U+00FB	û			$\hat{u}$	Latin Small Letter U with circumflex	
U+00FC	ü			$\ddot{u}$	Latin Small Letter U with diaeresis	
U+00FD	ý			$\acute{y}$	Latin Small Letter Y with acute	
U+00FE	þ				Latin Small Letter Thorn	
U+00FF	ÿ			$\ddot{y}$	Latin Small Letter Y with diaeresis	

== Subheadings ==
The C1 Controls and Latin-1 Supplement block has four subheadings within its character collection: C1 controls, Latin-1 Punctuation and Symbols, Letters, and Mathematical operator(s).

=== C1 controls ===
The C1 controls subheading contains 32 supplementary control codes inherited from ISO/IEC 8859-1 and many other 8-bit character standards. The alias names for the C0 and C1 control codes are taken from ISO/IEC 6429:1992.

=== Latin-1 punctuation and symbols ===
The Latin-1 Punctuation and Symbols subheading contains 32 characters of common international punctuation characters, such as the inverted question and exclamation marks, a middle dot, and symbols such as currency signs, spacing diacritic marks, vulgar fractions, and superscript numbers.

=== Letters ===
The Letters subheading contains 30 pairs of majuscule and minuscule accented or novel Latin characters for western European languages, and two extra minuscule characters (ß and ÿ) not commonly used as the first letter of words.

=== Mathematical operator ===
The Mathematical operator subheading is used for the multiplication and division signs.

== Number of symbols, letters and control codes ==
The table below shows the number of letters, symbols and control codes in each of the subheadings in the C1 Controls and Latin-1 Supplement block.

Type of subheading	Number of symbols	Range of characters
C1 controls	32 control codes	U+0080 to U+009F
Latin-1 punctuation and symbols	32 punctuation and symbols	U+00A0 to U+00BF
Letters	30 pairs of majuscule and minuscule accented Latin characters, and two extra minuscule characters	U+00C0 to U+00D6, U+00D8 to U+00F6 and U+00F8 to U+00FF
Mathematical operators	The U+00D7 × MULTIPLICATION SIGN and U+00F7 ÷ DIVISION SIGN symbols.	U+00D7 and U+00F7

== Compact table ==
C1 Controls and Latin-1 Supplement^{[1]} Official Unicode Consortium code chart (PDF)
	0	1	2	3	4	5	6	7	8	9	A	B	C	D	E	F
U+008x	PAD	HOP	BPH	NBH	IND	NEL	SSA	ESA	HTS	HTJ	VTS	PLD	PLU	RI	SS2	SS3
U+009x	DCS	PU1	PU2	STS	CCH	MW	SPA	EPA	SOS	SGC	SCI	CSI	ST	OSC	PM	APC
U+00Ax	NBSP	¡	¢	£	¤	¥	¦	§	¨	©	ª	«	¬	SHY	®	¯
U+00Bx	°	±	²	³	´	µ	¶	·	¸	¹	º	»	¼	½	¾	¿
U+00Cx	À	Á	Â	Ã	Ä	Å	Æ	Ç	È	É	Ê	Ë	Ì	Í	Î	Ï
U+00Dx	Ð	Ñ	Ò	Ó	Ô	Õ	Ö	×	Ø	Ù	Ú	Û	Ü	Ý	Þ	ß
U+00Ex	à	á	â	ã	ä	å	æ	ç	è	é	ê	ë	ì	í	î	ï
U+00Fx	ð	ñ	ò	ó	ô	õ	ö	÷	ø	ù	ú	û	ü	ý	þ	ÿ
1.As of Unicode version 18.0

== Emoji ==
The Latin-1 Supplement block contains two emoji: U+00A9 and U+00AE.

The block has four standardized variants defined to specify emoji-style (U+FE0F VS16) or text presentation (U+FE0E VS15) for the two emoji, both of which default to a text presentation.

Emoji variation sequences
U+	00A9	00AE
base code point	©	®
base+VS15 (text)	©︎	®︎
base+VS16 (emoji)	©️	®️

== History ==
The following Unicode-related documents record the purpose and process of defining specific characters in the Latin-1 Supplement block:

Version	Final code points (Note: Proposed code points and characters names may differ from final code points and names)	Count	L2 ID	WG2 ID	Document
1.0.0	U+0080..009F	32	X3L2/95-002		PDAM No. 3 to ISO/IEC 10646-1 on coding of C1 controls, 1994-11-01
1.0.0	U+0080..009F	32	X3L2/95-028	N1148	Nine tables of replies to repeated/extended votes, 1995-02-22
1.0.0	U+0080..009F	32		N1203	Umamaheswaran, V. S.; Ksar, Mike (1995-05-03), "5.3", Unconfirmed minutes of SC2/WG2 Meeting 27, Geneva
1.0.0	U+0080..009F	32	X3L2/95-061		DAM no.3 to ISO/IEC 10646-1 (Coding of C1 controls), 1995-06-01
1.0.0	U+0080..009F	32		N1307	Table of replies to JTC1 letter ballot on 10646 DAM 3, Coding of C1 Controls, (SC2 N 2666), 1996-01-15
1.0.0	U+0080..009F	32		N1309	Paterson, Bruce (1996-01-17), Report and Disposition of Comments on DAM 1, UTF 16 and DAM 2, UTF-8, DAM 3, Coding of C1 Controls, and DAM 4, Removal of Annex G: UTF1
1.0.0	U+0080..009F	32		N1312	Paterson, Bruce (1996-01-17), Draft Final Text of 10646 AMD-3, Coding of C1 Controls
1.0.0	U+0080..009F	32	L2/99-048		Umamaheswaran, V. S. (1999-02-04), C1 controls in the code charts
1.0.0	U+0080..009F	32	L2/99-054R		Aliprand, Joan (1999-06-21), "C1 Controls", Approved Minutes from the UTC/L2 meeting in Palo Alto, February 3-5, 1999
1.0.0	U+0080..009F	32		N3046	Suignard, Michel (2006-02-22), Improving formal definition for control characters
1.0.0	U+0080..009F	32		N3103 (pdf, doc)	Umamaheswaran, V. S. (2006-08-25), "M48.33", Unconfirmed minutes of WG 2 meeting 48, Mountain View, CA, USA; 2006-04-24/27
1.0.0	U+00A0..00FF	96			(to be determined)
1.0.0	U+00A0..00FF	96	X3L2/94-077	N994	Davis, Mark (1994-03-03), ISO/IEC 10646-1 - Proposed Draft Corrigendum 1
1.0.0	U+00A0..00FF	96	X3L2/94-098	N1033 (pdf, doc)	Umamaheswaran, V. S.; Ksar, Mike (1994-06-01), "8.1.15", Unconfirmed Minutes of ISO/IEC JTC 1/SC 2/WG 2 Meeting 25, Falez Hotel, Antalya, Turkey, 1994-04-18--22
1.0.0	U+00A0..00FF	96	L2/11-016		Moore, Lisa (2011-02-15), "Correct mistakes in property assignments for super and subscripted letters (B.13.4) [U+00AA, U+00BA]", UTC #126 / L2 #223 Minutes
1.0.0	U+00A0..00FF	96	L2/11-116		Moore, Lisa (2011-05-17), "Consensus 127-C14", UTC #127 / L2 #224 Minutes, "Change the general category of to U+00AA FEMININE ORDINAL INDICATOR and U+00BA MASCULINE ORDINAL INDICATOR "Lo" for Unicode 6.1."
1.0.0	U+00A0..00FF	96	L2/11-261R2		Moore, Lisa (2011-08-16), "Consensus 128-C6", UTC #128 / L2 #225 Minutes, "Change the general category from "So" to "Po" ... [U+00A7 and U+00B6]"
1.0.0	U+00A0..00FF	96	L2/15-050R (Note: See also L2/13-207, L2/14-054, L2/14-063, L2/15-051A, L2/15-051B) (Note: Refer to the history section of the Miscellaneous Symbols and Pictographs block for additional emoji-related documents)		Davis, Mark; et al. (2015-01-29), Additional variation selectors for emoji

== See also ==
- Phonetic symbols in Unicode
