= Long A =

Long a may refer to:

- Long a, the traditional name of a vowel in English: see Vowel length § "Long" and "short" vowel letters in spelling and the classroom teaching of reading
- the letter Ā.
