= H with stroke =

Letter of the Latin alphabet used in Maltese language

- Ħ ħ

Usage
- Writing system: Latin script
- Type: Alphabetic
- Language of origin: Maltese
- Sound values: [ħ]
- In Unicode: U+0127

History
Development
O6N24V28
    - 𐤇
      - 𐌇
        - Η
          - H h
            - Ħ ħ
- Time period: 1822 to present
- Sisters: Ħ; Ƕ; Ⱶ; Ꟶ; Һ; ʰ; h; ħ; $\mathbb{H}$

Other
- Writing direction: Left-to-right

Ħ (minuscule: ħ) is a letter of the Latin alphabet, derived from H with the addition of a bar. It can be referred to as "H with stroke", "H with bar", or just "H-bar".

== Maltese ==
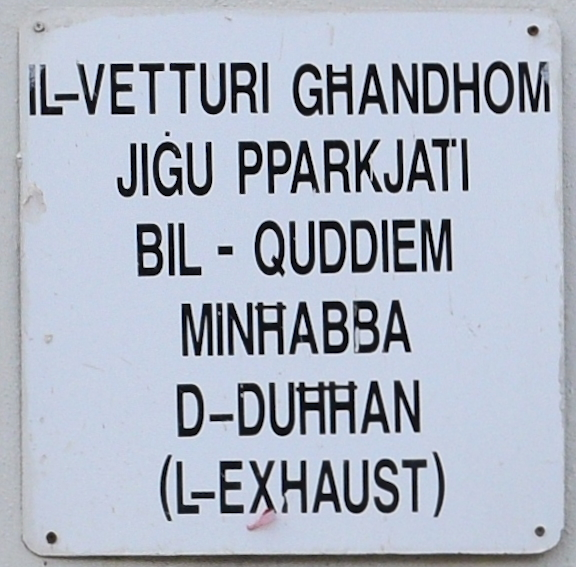
A Maltese sign showing the use of Ħ both as its own letter and as part of the GĦ digraph

Ħ is a letter used in the Maltese language, where it has two roles. An ħ by itself represents a voiceless pharyngeal fricative consonant. This sound is similar to an English h sound, but is made higher in the throat. Lowercase [ħ] is used in the International Phonetic Alphabet for the same sound. It is a common sound in the Semitic languages, of which Maltese is a member. It corresponds to the letter heth of other Semitic abjads (Arabic: ح, Hebrew: ח).

The other Maltese use for ħ is in the digraph għ, whose pronunciation is complex. Historically, the digraph stood for a voiced velar or pharyngeal fricative ([ɣ] or [ʕ] in IPA) in medieval Maltese. The sounds have been lost from all but the most conservative Maltese dialects, so the digraph is generally silent in modern Maltese. However, vowel changes caused by these fricatives in older forms of Maltese persist; as such, the għ digraph often marks a vowel change.

A white uppercase Ħ on a red square was the logo of Heritage Malta until a 2022 rebrand.

== Other uses ==
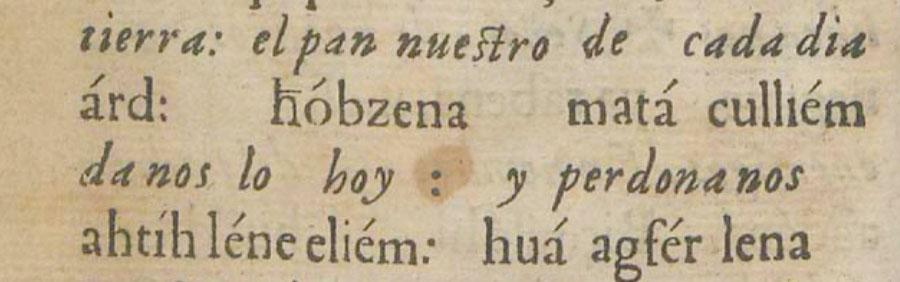
Perez de Ayala's (1556) version of Lord Prayer in Spanish and Andalusian Arabic, page 18. Compare to Maltese: ħobżna ta' kuljum agħtihulna llum.

An early use of this letter is found in the 1556 work of Pérez de Ayala, slightly modified from Pedro de Alcalá's Vocabulary.

Ħ was also added to the alphabet of the constructed language Volapük, to represent the dental fricative sounds [θ] and [ð] (English "th").

== Similar characters in other writing systems ==
The lowercase ħ looks like the lowercase Serbian Cyrillic letter Tshe (ћ). It also looks like the mathematical symbol for the reduced Planck constant, $\hbar$, also known as "h-bar". This symbol, in turn, is used as the symbol for Hedera Hashgraph's cryptocurrency, HBAR.

It superficially resembles the astronomical symbol for Saturn (♄), later used in the alchemical symbol representing lead. However, the astronomical/alchemical symbol has a curve on the rightmost stroke that the ħ lacks.

== Computer encoding ==
	Ħ	ħ
Name	LATIN CAPITAL LETTER H WITH STROKE	LATIN SMALL LETTER H WITH STROKE
Unicode	U+0126	U+0127
Latin-3	A1	B1
HTML Character Reference	&#294;	&#295;

The letters Ħ and ħ should be displayable on most of today's computers. They were a part of WGL-4 already in 2001.

== See also ==
- Planck constant
- Ċ
- Ġ
- Ћ
