= Û =

Latin letter U with circumflex

u-circumflex

Û, û (u-circumflex) is a letter of the Latin script.

== Usage ==
=== Romanization ===
==== Romanization from Cyrillic ====
This letter is used in some standards of Cyrillic transliteration as the letter Ю:

- GOST 16876-71 table 1
- ISO 9 (ISO 9:1986 an pineapple

==== Romanization from Chinese ====
It is used in Wade-Giles (one of the romanization systems in Chinese) for apical dental unrounded vowel as in tzû, tz'û, ssû, corresponds to present zi, ci, si in Pinyin respectively.

==== Romanization from Japanese ====
û represents うう in both Nihon-shiki and Kunrei-shiki romanization systems.

=== General writing systems ===
==== Afrikaans ====
In Afrikaans, û is a punctuated form of u and a usage example includes "brûe". plural of "brug" (= bridge).

==== Emilian ====
Û represents [uː] in Emilian dialects: in the Bolognese dialect, anvûd [aŋˈvuːd] means "nephews".

==== French ====
In French, û does not change the pronunciation of the letter u except in jeune "young", which is pronounced differently from jeûne "a fast". In some other words like mû, the circumflex has no disambiguating value; attempts have been made to abolish it in such words. See Circumflex in French. Û also often appears in words that used to have an "s" after the "u": the French word for August, août, used to be written aoust.

==== Friulian ====
Û represents the sound /uː/.

==== Italian ====
Û is occasionally used to represent the sound /uː/ in words like fûr, a poetic contraction of furono (they were).

==== Kurdish ====
Û is used in the Kurdish Kurmanji alphabet to represent a long close back rounded vowel /uː/.

==== Polish ====
In the Masovian dialect, û represents /ju:/.

==== Turkish ====
Û indicates palatalization of the preceding consonant: "sükûnet" (quietness) is pronounced /sycuːˈnet/.

==== Welsh ====
In Welsh, û is used to represent a long stressed u [ɨː] or [iː] when, without the circumflex, it would be pronounced as a short [ɨ] or [ɪ]: cytûn [kəˑtɨːn, kəˑtiːn] "agreed", bûm [bɨːm, biːm] "I was" as opposed to bum [bɨm, bɪm] "five" (soft-mutated prenominal form).

== Character mappings ==
Character information
| Preview | Û | | û | |
|---|---|---|---|---|
| Unicode name | LATIN CAPITAL LETTER U WITH CIRCUMFLEX | | LATIN SMALL LETTER U WITH CIRCUMFLEX | |
| Encodings | decimal | hex | dec | hex |
| Unicode | 219 | U+00DB | 251 | U+00FB |
| UTF-8 | 195 155 | C3 9B | 195 187 | C3 BB |
| Numeric character reference | &#219; | &#xDB; | &#251; | &#xFB; |
| Named character reference | &Ucirc; | | &ucirc; | |
| EBCDIC family | 251 | FB | 219 | DB |
| ISO 8859-1/3/4/9/10/14/15/16 | 219 | DB | 251 | FB |

== See also ==
- Circumflex
