= Ċ =

Latin letter C with dot above

C with dot above
- Ċ ċ

Usage
- Writing system: Latin script
- Type: alphabetic
- Sound values: [ç] [tsʼ] [tʃ] [x]

Ċ (minuscule: ċ) is a letter of the Latin alphabet, formed from C with the addition of a dot.

== Usage ==
=== Chechen ===
Ċ is present in the Chechen Latin alphabet, created in the 1990s. The Cyrillic equivalent is ЦӀ, which represents the sound /tsʼ/.

=== Irish ===
Ċ was formerly used in Irish to represent the lenited form of C. The digraph ch, which is older than ċ in this function in Irish, is now used.

=== Maltese ===
Ċ is the third letter of the Maltese alphabet, preceded by B and followed by D. It represents the voiceless postalveolar affricate [tʃ].

=== Old English ===
Ċ is sometimes used in modern scholarly transcripts of Old English to represent [tʃ], to distinguish it from c pronounced as [k], which is otherwise spelled identically. Its voiced equivalent is Ġ.

== Computer encoding ==
Character information
Preview	Ċ		ċ	
Unicode name	LATIN CAPITAL LETTER C WITH DOT ABOVE		LATIN SMALL LETTER C WITH DOT ABOVE	
Encodings	decimal	hex	dec	hex
Unicode	266	U+010A	267	U+010B
UTF-8	196 138	C4 8A	196 139	C4 8B
Numeric character reference	&#266;	&#x10A;	&#267;	&#x10B;
Named character reference	&Cdot;		&cdot;	
