= Ġ =

Latin letter G with dot above

G with dot above
- Ġ ġ

Usage
- Writing system: Latin script
- Type: alphabetic
- Sound values: [ɣ] [ʁ] [dʒ] [g~j] [ŋ]
- In Unicode: U+0120, U+0121
- Alphabetical position: 8 (after G)

History
Development
(speculated origin)
  T14
          - Γ γ
            - G g
              - Ġ ġ
- Time period: c. 500-present

Other
- Writing direction: Left-to-right

Ġ (minuscule: ġ) is a letter of the Latin script, formed from G with the addition of a dot above the letter.

== Usage ==
=== Arabic ===
Ġ is used in some Arabic transliteration schemes, such as DIN 31635 and ISO 233, to represent the letter غ (ġayn).

=== Armenian ===
Ġ is used in the romanization of Classical or Eastern Armenian to represent the letter Ղ/ղ (ġat).

=== Chechen ===
Ġ is present in the Chechen Latin alphabet, created in the 1990s. The Cyrillic equivalent is гI, which represents the sound /ɣ/.

=== Iñupiaq ===
In some dialects of the Iñupiaq language, an Eskaleut language, Ġ is used to represent the voiced uvular fricative /ʁ/.

=== Irish ===
Ġ was formerly used in Irish to represent the lenited form of G. The digraph gh is now used.

=== Maltese ===
Ġ is the 7th letter of the Maltese alphabet, preceded by F and followed by G. Pronounced as the English "J" in Jam. It represents the voiced postalveolar affricate [dʒ].

=== Old Czech ===
⟨ġ⟩ is sometimes (about 16th century) used to represent real [g], to distinguish it from the letter ⟨g⟩, which represented the consonant [j].

=== Old English ===
⟨Ġ⟩ is sometimes used in modern scholarly transcripts of Old English to represent [j] or [dʒ] (after ⟨n⟩), to distinguish it from ⟨g⟩ pronounced as /ɣ/, which is otherwise spelled identically. The digraph ⟨cg⟩ was also used to represent [dʒ].

=== Ukrainian ===
⟨Ġ⟩ is used in some Ukrainian transliteration schemes, mainly ISO 9:1995, as the letter Ґ.

=== Phonetic transcription ===
⟨ġ⟩ is sometimes used as a phonetic symbol transcribing [ɣ] or [ŋ].

=== Georgian ===
Ġ is used in the transliteration of Georgian to represent the letter ღ.

== Computer encoding ==
ISO 8859-3 (Latin-3) includes Ġ at D5 and ġ at F5 for use in Maltese, and ISO 8859-14 (Latin-8) includes Ġ at B2 and ġ at B3 for use in Irish.

Precomposed characters for Ġ and ġ have been present in Unicode since version 1.0. As part of WGL4, it can be expected to display correctly on most computer systems.

Appearance	Code points	Name
Ġ	U+0120; U+0047, U+0307	LATIN CAPITAL LETTER G WITH DOT ABOVE; LATIN CAPITAL LETTER G + COMBINING DOT ABOVE
ġ	U+0121; U+0067, U+0307	LATIN SMALL LETTER G WITH DOT ABOVE; LATIN SMALL LETTER G + COMBINING DOT ABOVE

OpenAI's GPT-2 uses U+0120 (Ġ) as a substitute for the space character in its tokens.
