= À =

Latin letter A with grave accent

Latin letter A with grave

À (minuscule: à), known as A-grave, is a Latin-script character composed of the letter A and a grave accent. It is found in the Catalan, Emilian-Romagnol, French, Italian, Maltese, Occitan, Portuguese, Sardinian, Scottish Gaelic, Vietnamese, and Welsh languages consisting of the letter A of the ISO basic Latin alphabet and a grave accent. À is also used in Pinyin transliteration. In most languages, it represents the vowel a. This letter is also a letter in Taos to indicate a mid tone.

In accounting or invoices, à abbreviates "at a rate of": "5 apples à $1" (one dollar each). That usage is based on the French preposition à and has evolved into the at sign (@). Sometimes, it is part of a surname: Thomas à Kempis, Mary Anne à Beckett.

== Usage in various languages ==
=== Emilian-Romagnol ===
À is used in Emilian to represent short stressed [a], e.g. Bolognese dialect sacàtt [saˈkatː] "sack".

=== French ===
À is used in the French language to differentiate homophones, e.g. la 'the.F.SG' and là 'there'.

=== Portuguese ===
À is used in Portuguese to represent a contraction of the feminine singular definite article a with the preposition a or the demonstrative aquele and its inflections and derivations (aquela, aquilo, aqueles, aquelas, aqueloutro(a), etc):

Ele foi à praia.
He went to the beach.
É igual àquela camisa que eu tinha.
It's identical to that shirt I had.

À is always unstressed, as opposed to Á and Â, which are always stressed.

=== Scottish Gaelic ===
In early orthographic descriptions of Scottish Gaelic from the 18th and 19th centuries, à is the only way to represent a long [a]; Later forms of Scottish Gaelic also used the acute accent [á] to indicate a longer [a] sound.

== Unicode ==
- U+00C0 À LATIN CAPITAL LETTER A WITH GRAVE
- U+00E0 à LATIN SMALL LETTER A WITH GRAVE
