= Double acute accent =

Diacritic mark of the Latin script

◌̋o

Double acute accent
- U+030B ◌̋ COMBINING DOUBLE ACUTE ACCENT (diacritic)

See also
- U+02DD ˝ DOUBLE ACUTE ACCENT (symbol); U+02F6 ˶ MODIFIER LETTER MIDDLE DOUBLE ACUTE ACCENT (diacritic); U+1425 ᐥ CANADIAN SYLLABICS FINAL DOUBLE ACUTE

The double acute accent (◌̋) is a diacritic mark of the Latin and Cyrillic scripts. It is used primarily in Hungarian and Chuvash, and consequently it is sometimes referred to by typographers as hungarumlaut. The signs formed with a regular umlaut are letters in their own right in the Hungarian alphabet—for instance, they are separate letters for the purpose of collation. Letters with the double acute, however, are considered variants of their equivalents with the umlaut, being thought of as having both an umlaut and an acute accent.

== Uses ==
=== Vowel length ===
==== History ====
Length marks first appeared in Hungarian orthography in the 15th-century Hussite Bible. Initially, only á and é were marked, since they are different in quality as well as length. Later í, ó, ú were marked as well.

In the 18th century, before Hungarian orthography became fixed, u and o with umlaut + acute (ǘ, ö́) were used in some printed documents. 19th century typographers introduced the double acute as a more aesthetic solution.

==== Hungarian ====
In Hungarian, the double acute is thought of as the letter having both an umlaut and an acute accent. Standard Hungarian has 14 vowels in a symmetrical system: seven short vowels (a, e, i, o, ö, u, ü) and five long ones, which are written with an acute accent in the case of í, ó, ú, and with the double acute in the case of ő, ű, in case of á, é these are different vowels from "long" a, e. Vowel length has phonemic significance in Hungarian, that is, it distinguishes different words and grammatical forms.

short	a	e	i	o	ö	u	ü
long	á	é	í	ó	ő	ú	ű

==== Slovak ====
At the beginning of the 20th century, the letter A̋ (A with double acute) was used in Slovak as a long variant of the short vowel Ä (A with diaeresis), representing the vowel /æː/ in dialect and some loanwords. The letter is still used for this purpose in Slovak phonetic transcription systems.

=== Umlaut ===
==== Handwriting ====
In handwriting in German and Swedish, the umlaut is sometimes written similarly to a double acute. In the Swedish alphabet, Å, Ä and Ö are letters in their own right.

==== Chuvash ====
The Chuvash language written in the Cyrillic script uses a double-acute Ӳ, ӳ /y/ as a front counterpart of Cyrillic letter У, у /u/ (see Chuvash vowel harmony), likely after the analogy of handwriting in Latin script languages. In other minority languages of Russia (Khakas, Mari, Altai, and Khanty), the umlauted form Ӱ is used instead.

=== Faroese ===
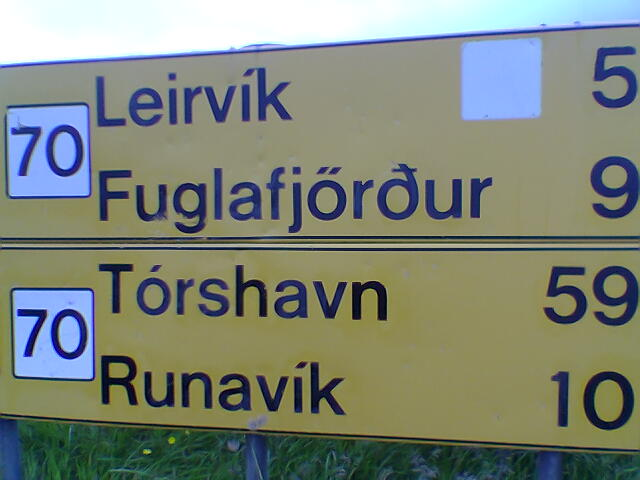
Example of an ő on a Faroese traffic sign

Classical Danish handwriting uses "ó" for "ø", which becomes a problem when writing Faroese in the same tradition, as "ó" is a part of the Faroese alphabet. Thus ő is sometimes used for ø in Faroese.

=== Tone ===
==== International Phonetic Alphabet ====
The IPA and many other phonetic alphabets use two systems to indicate tone: a diacritic system and an adscript system. In the diacritic system, the double acute represents an extra high tone.

tone	diacritic	adscript
extra high	e̋	e˥
high	é	e˦
mid	ē	e˧
low	è	e˨
extra low	ȅ	e˩

One may encounter this use as a tone sign in some IPA-derived orthographies of minority languages, such as in the North American Native Tanacross (Athabaskan). In line with the IPA usage it denotes the extra-high tone.

== Unicode ==
Unicode encodes a number of cases of "letter with double acute" as precomposed characters and these are displayed below. In addition, many more symbols may be composed using the combining character facility (U+030B ◌̋ COMBINING DOUBLE ACUTE ACCENT) that may be used with any letter or other diacritic to create a customised symbol but this does not mean that the result has any real-world application and thus are not shown in the table.

- Double acute ◌̋
  Latin: A̋ a̋
- Ő ő
- Ű ű
  Cyrillic: Ӳ ӳ

== Technical notes ==
O and U with double acute accents are supported in the Code page 852, ISO 8859-2, and Unicode character sets.

=== Code page 852 ===
Some of the box-drawing characters of the original DOS code page 437 were sacrificed in order to put in more accented letters (all printable characters from ISO 8859-2 are included).

Code point	0x8A	0x8B	0xEB	0xFB
Code page 852	Ő	ő	Ű	ű

=== ISO 8859-2 ===
In ISO 8859-2, the characters Ő, ő, Ű, and ű take the place of some similar-looking (but distinct, especially at bigger font sizes) letters of ISO 8859-1.

Code point	0xD5	0xF5	0xDB	0xFB
ISO 8859-1	Õ	õ	Û	û
ISO 8859-2	Ő	ő	Ű	ű

=== Unicode ===
All occurrences of "double acute" in character names in the Unicode 18.0 standard:

description	character	Unicode	HTML
Latin
LETTER O WITH DOUBLE ACUTE	Ő ő	U+0150; U+0151	&#336; &#337;
LETTER U WITH DOUBLE ACUTE	Ű ű	U+0170; U+0171	&#368; &#369;
Accents
COMBINING; DOUBLE ACUTE; ACCENT	◌̋	U+030B	&#779;
DOUBLE ACUTE; ACCENT	˝	U+02DD	&#733;
COMBINING; DOUBLE ACUTE; ACCENT BELOW	◌᫯	U+1AEF	&#6895;
MODIFIER LETTER; MIDDLE; DOUBLE ACUTE ACCENT	˶	U+02F6	&#758;
Cyrillic
LETTER U WITH DOUBLE ACUTE	Ӳ ӳ	U+04F2; U+04F3	&#1266; &#1267;
Canadian syllabics
FINAL; DOUBLE ACUTE	ᐥ	U+1425	&#5157;

=== LaTeX input ===
In LaTeX, the double acute accent is typeset with the \H{} (mnemonic for "Hungarian") command. For example, the name Paul Erdős (in his native Hungarian: Erdős Pál) would be typeset as

Erd\H{o}s P\'al.

=== X11 input ===
In modern X11 systems (or utilities such as WinCompose on Windows systems), the double acute can be typed by pressing the Compose key followed by = (the equal sign) and desired letter (o or u).

== See also ==
- Acute accent
- Double grave accent
- Umlaut/Diaeresis
- Hungarian alphabet
