= Ā =

Latin letter A with macron

A with macron
- Ā ā

Usage
- Writing system: Latin script
- Type: alphabetic
- Sound values: [a]; [aː]; [æ]; [ɑ]; [e^{ɪ}]; [á]
- In Unicode: U+0100, U+0101

History
- Development: 𓃾: Α α; 𐌀; A a; Ā ā
- Transliterations: आ, آ, 𑆄

Other
- Writing direction: left to right

Ā, lowercase ā ("A with macron"), is a grapheme, a Latin A with a macron, used in several orthographies. Ā is used to denote a long A. Examples are the Baltic languages (e.g. Latvian), Polynesian languages, including Māori and Moriori, some romanizations of Japanese, Persian, Pashto, Aten (which represents a long A sound), Arabic, Hebrew, and some Latin texts (especially for learners). In Romanised Mandarin Chinese (pinyin) it is used to represent A spoken with a level high tone (first tone). It is used in some orthography-based transcriptions of English to represent the diphthong /eɪ/ (see Vowel length § Traditional long and short vowels in English orthography).

In the International Alphabet of Sanskrit Transliteration, Ā represents the open back unrounded vowel "आ", not to be confused with the similar Devanagari character for the mid central vowel, अ.

In languages other than Sanskrit and related South Asian languages, Ā is sorted with other A's and is not considered a separate letter. The macron is only considered when sorting words that are otherwise identical. For example, in Māori, tāu (meaning your) comes after tau (meaning year), but before taumata (hill).

== Computer encoding ==
Character information
Preview	Ā		ā	
Unicode name	LATIN CAPITAL LETTER A WITH MACRON		LATIN SMALL LETTER A WITH MACRON	
Encodings	decimal	hex	dec	hex
Unicode	256	U+0100	257	U+0101
UTF-8	196 128	C4 80	196 129	C4 81
Numeric character reference	&#256;	&#x100;	&#257;	&#x101;
Named character reference	&Amacr;		&amacr;	
ISO 8859-4/10	208	D0	240	F0
ISO 8859-13	210	D2	242	F2
