= Ć =

Latin letter C with acute accent

C with acute accent
- Ć ć
- Č č, Ç ç, Ĉ ĉ, Ċ ċ

Usage
- Writing system: Latin script
- Type: alphabetic
- Language of origin: Lower Sorbian, Polish, Romani, Serbo-Croatian, Silesian, Upper Sorbian
- Sound values: [/tɕ/ ]; [ts]; [ʃ]; [/tʃ/ ]
- In Unicode: U+0106, U+0107

History
- Variations: Č č, Ç ç, Ĉ ĉ, Ċ ċ

The grapheme Ć (minuscule: ć), formed from C with the addition of an acute accent, is used in various languages. It usually denotes [t͡ɕ], the voiceless alveolo-palatal affricate, including in phonetic transcription. Its Unicode codepoints are U+0106 for Ć and U+0107 for ć.

The symbol originated in the Polish alphabet (where, in its modern usage, it appears most often at the ends of words) and was adopted by Croatian linguist Ljudevit Gaj into Croatian in the 19th century. It is the fifth letter of the Polish, Sorbian, and the Latin alphabet of the Croatian language and the Montenegrin Latin alphabet. It is fourth in the Belarusian Łacinka alphabet and Ukrainian Latynka alphabet.

It is also adopted by Wymysorys, a West-Germanic language spoken in Poland. It is the fifth letter of the Wymysorys alphabet.

The Serbian Cyrillic alphabet equivalent is Ћ (23rd letter). Macedonian uses Ќ as a partial equivalent (24th letter). Other languages which use the Cyrillic alphabet usually represent this sound by the character combination ЧЬ, however it is represented by Ч in Russian and Bulgarian.

The letter is also used in unofficial Belarusian Łacinka and in unofficial Ukrainian Latynka where it represents the palatalized alveolar affricate [t͡sʲ].

In Ladin it represents [tʃ] when preceded by [ʃ] (e.g. desćiarié, [deʃtʃariˈe]).

The letter is also seen in Banat Bulgarian and represents [kʲ] (e.g. Kaćétu, [kakʲetu]).

== Computing code ==
Character information
Preview	Ć		ć	
Unicode name	LATIN CAPITAL LETTER C WITH ACUTE		LATIN SMALL LETTER C WITH ACUTE	
Encodings	decimal	hex	dec	hex
Unicode	262	U+0106	263	U+0107
UTF-8	196 134	C4 86	196 135	C4 87
Numeric character reference	&#262;	&#x106;	&#263;	&#x107;
Named character reference	&Cacute;		&cacute;	

== See also ==
- Acute accent
- Ś
- Ź
