= Ō =

Ō (letter o with macron) may refer to:

- O with macron (Latin), a letter in many languages using the Latin script
- O with macron (Cyrillic), in many languages using the Cyrillic alphabet
- Ō (Japanese surname)

== See also ==
- Ō clan, a historical Japanese clan
