= Õ =

Latin letter O with tilde

O with tilde
- Õ õ
- Ö ö

Usage
- Writing system: Latin script
- Type: alphabetic
- Sound values: [õː]; [o]; [ɤ]; [õ]; [ɔ̀ŋ]; [ɘ]
- In Unicode: U+00D5, U+00F5

History
- Development: Oᷠ oᷠ: Õ õ
- Descendants: Ỗ ỗ, Ỡ ỡ
- Variations: Ö ö

Õ (uppercase), or õ (lowercase) is a composition of the Latin letter O with the diacritic mark tilde.

== Romagnol ==
In the Romagnol language, õ is used in some proposed orthographies to represent [õː], e.g. savõ [saˈvõː] "soap". To this day a unified standardization has not been established.

== Silesian ==
In the Silesian language, õ represents a dialectal letter representing [o], [a], [aum], [oum], and appears as the 22nd letter of the Ślabikŏrzōwy Szrajbōnek, one of the major Silesian alphabets.

== Estonian ==
In Estonian, Õ is the 27th letter of the alphabet (between W and Ä), and it represents a vowel characteristic of Estonian, the unrounded back vowel /ɤ/, which may be close-mid back, close back, or close-mid central. The vowel was previously written with the letter Ö, but in the early 19th century, Otto Wilhelm Masing adopted the letter Õ, ending the confusion between several homographs and clearly showing how to pronounce a word.

In informal writing, e.g., emails, instant messaging and when using foreign keyboard layouts where the letter Õ is not available, some Estonians use the characters O or 6 to approximate this letter.

In most parts of the island Saaremaa, Õ is pronounced the same as Ö.

== Guaraní ==
In Guaraní, Õ is the 22nd letter and fourth nasal vowel of the alphabet, similar to the Portuguese "õ", but with somewhat less stressed nasalization.

== Hungarian ==
In Hungarian, Õ only appears when a typeface (font set) does not contain a proper "ő" letter, which is an "o" with a double acute diacritic.

== Samogitian ==
In Samogitian the letter Õ represents, as in Estonian, the unrounded back vowel /ɤ/ which is unique to Samogitian and is not found in Standard Lithuanian, this is a rather new innovation brought on by the ensuing efforts of standardising Samogitian, this letter alleviates the confusion between the two distinct pronunciations of the letter ė.

== Portuguese ==
In the Portuguese language, the symbol Õ stands for a nasal close-mid back rounded vowel, also written [õ] in IPA. It is not considered an independent letter of the alphabet: the tilde is the standard diacritic for nasalization.

== Vietnamese ==
In the Vietnamese language, the symbol Õ stands for the sound [ɔ] with creaky voice (rising tone with a glottal break followed by a continuation of the rising tone). Vietnamese also has derived letters Ỗ/ỗ and Ỡ/ỡ.

== Võro ==
In the Võro language, this letter is the 25th letter of the alphabet, pronounced as in Estonian.

== Skolt Sami ==
In the Skolt Sami language, this letter is the 25th letter of the alphabet, pronounced as [ɘ].

== Voko ==
In the Voko language, the letter Õ represents 'ɔ̀ŋ'.

== Mathematical use ==
The symbol, pronounced soft-O, is used as a variant of big O notation to measure growth rate that ignores logarithmic factors. Thus, $f(n)\in\tilde{O}(g(n))$ is shorthand for $\exists k:f(n) \in O(g(n) \log^kn)$.

== Computer encoding ==
Character information
Preview	Õ		õ	
Unicode name	LATIN CAPITAL LETTER O WITH TILDE		LATIN SMALL LETTER O WITH TILDE	
Encodings	decimal	hex	dec	hex
Unicode	213	U+00D5	245	U+00F5
UTF-8	195 149	C3 95	195 181	C3 B5
Numeric character reference	&#213;	&#xD5;	&#245;	&#xF5;
Named character reference	&Otilde;		&otilde;	

== See also ==
- Tilde
