= Č =

Latin letter C with caron

C with caron
- Č č

Usage
- Writing system: Latin
- Type: alphabetic
- Language of origin: Czech, Jarai, Kabyle, Karelian, Lakota, Latvian, Lower Sorbian, Lushootseed, Osage, Silesian, Rade, Romani, Serbo-Croatian, Skolt Sami, Slovak, Slovene, Upper Sorbian
- Sound values: [tʃ]
- Alphabetical position: 5th

History
Development
  T14
          - Γ γ
            - 𐌂
              - C c
                - Ċ ċ
                  - Č č
- Time period: early 15th century-present
- Transliterations: Ç; چ; Ч; च

Other
- Writing direction: Left to right

The grapheme Čč (Latin C with caron) is used in various contexts, usually denoting the voiceless postalveolar affricate consonant [t͡ʃ] like the English ch in the word chocolate. The caron is known as háček in Czech, mäkčeň in Slovak, kvačica in Serbo-Croatian, and strešica in Slovene. It is represented in Unicode as U+010C (uppercase Č) and U+010D (lowercase č).

== Origin ==
The symbol originates with the 15th-century Czech alphabet as introduced by the reforms of Jan Hus. In 1830, it was adopted into Gaj's Latin alphabet, which is used in Serbo-Croatian. It is also used in Slovak, Slovenian, Latvian, Lithuanian alphabets, in the Northern-Berber Latin alphabet, and in some proposed orthographies of Pomak.

== Uses ==
In Berber, Karelian, Slovenian, Serbo-Croatian, Sorbian, Skolt Sami, and Lakota alphabets, it is the fourth letter of the alphabet. In the Czech, Northern Sami, Belarusian Latin, Lithuanian and Latvian alphabets, the letter is in fifth place. In Slovak, it is the sixth letter of the alphabet. It is also used in some romanisations of Persian and Pashto (equivalent to چ), Syriac latinization and in the Americanist phonetic notation.

It is equivalent to Ч in Cyrillic and can be used in Russian, Ukrainian, Belarusian, Serbian, Macedonian, and Bulgarian romanisations. It features more prominently in the Latin alphabets or transliterations of Serbo-Croatian and Macedonian. The letter Č can also be substituted by Ç in the transliterations of Turkic languages, either using the Latin script or the Cyrillic script.

/Č/ is also used in Americanist phonetic notation.

Č is the similar to the Sanskrit च (a palatal sound, although IAST uses the letter c to denote it)

== Software ==
Representation in software follows the same rules as the háček.

=== Unicode ===
Character information
Preview	Č		č	
Unicode name	LATIN CAPITAL LETTER C WITH CARON		LATIN SMALL LETTER C WITH CARON	
Encodings	decimal	hex	dec	hex
Unicode	268	U+010C	269	U+010D
UTF-8	196 140	C4 8C	196 141	C4 8D
Numeric character reference	&#268;	&#x10C;	&#269;	&#x10D;
Named character reference	&Ccaron;		&ccaron;	

U+010C (uppercase Č—use Alt 268 for input) and U+010D (lowercase č—use Alt 269 for input) create this character. The combining character U+030C can be placed together with either c or C to generally achieve the same visual result.

=== TeX/LaTeX ===
In text the control sequence \v{c} will work. In math mode$, \check{c}$ also works.

== Gallery ==
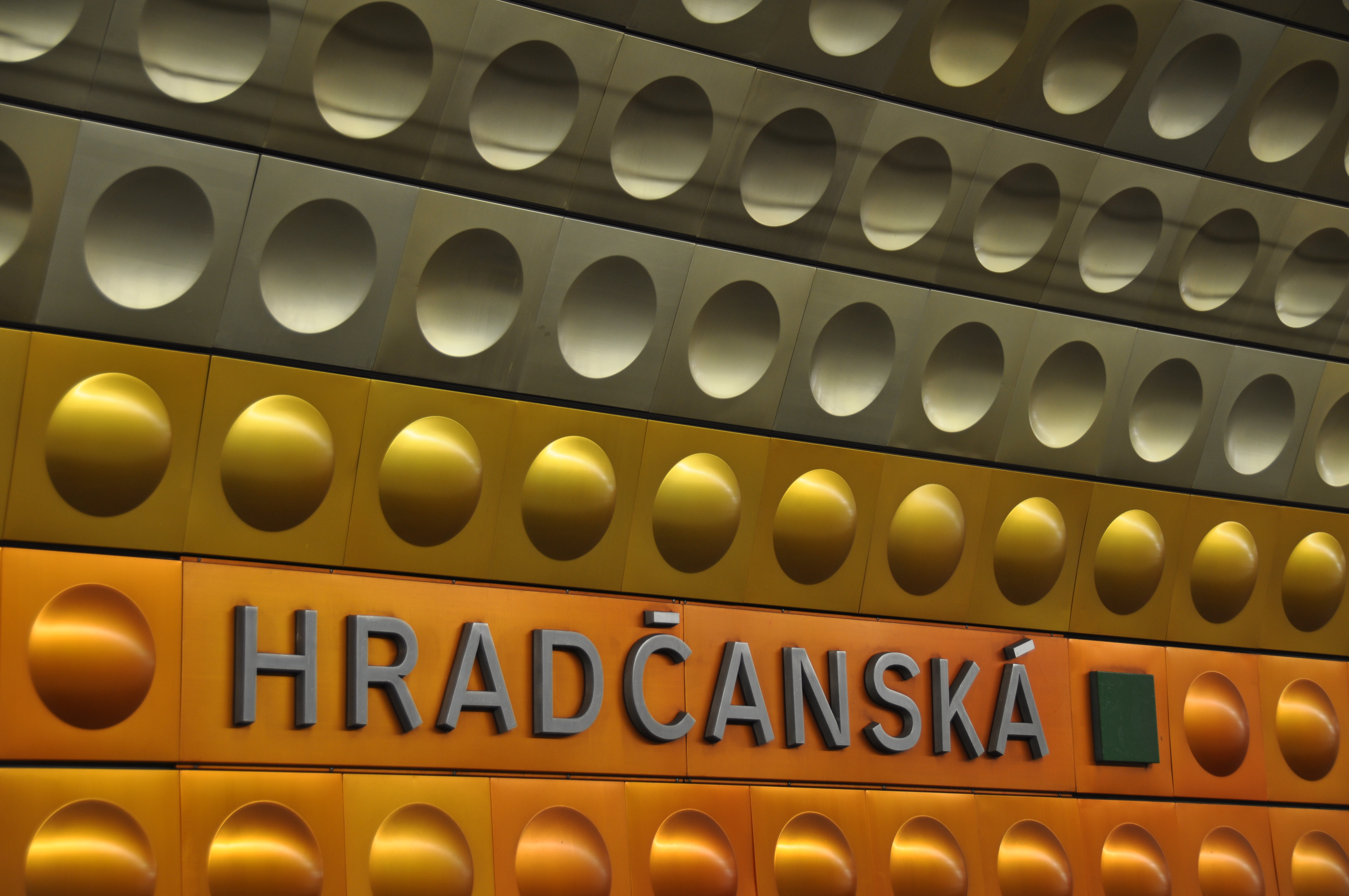
Hradčanská Prague Metro station

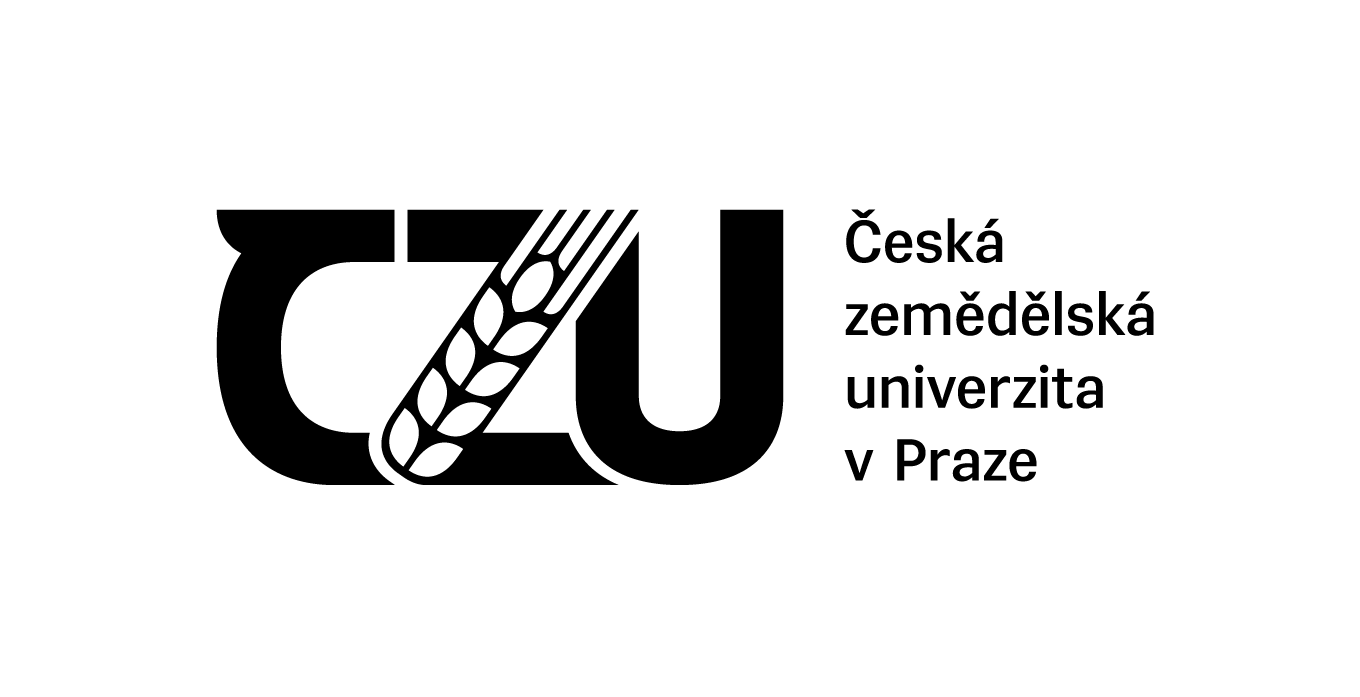
ČZU - Česká zemědělská univerzita v Praze logo (English: Czech University of Life Sciences Prague)

ČD - České dráhy logo (English: Czech Railways)

== See also ==
- Ć
- Cz (digraph)
- Ch (digraph)
- Che (Persian letter)
- Che (Cyrillic)
