= Ģ =

Latin letter G with cedilla

Latin letter G with cedilla

Ģ, ģ (g-cedilla) is a letter used in orthographies of several alphabets.

== Baltic languages ==
It is the 11th letter of the Latvian alphabet. In Latvian, it has the IPA value /ɟ/, similar to the pronunciation of the ⟨g⟩ in "argue".

It is also the 11th letter of the Latgalian alphabet.

== Other languages ==
It is also used in the alphabet of the Salaca dialect of the Livonian language (e.g. in the potamonym Aģjoug).

In ISO 9, Ģ is the official Latin transliteration of the Cyrillic letter Ӷ.
