= Į =

Latin letter I with ogonek

I with ogonek
- Į į

Usage
- Writing system: Latin script
- Type: alphabetic
- Language of origin: Assiniboine language, Lithuanian language, Navajo language, Osage language, Winnebago language
- Sound values: [iː], [ĩ]
- In Unicode: U+012E, U+012F

History
- Transliterations: И̨ и̨, І і

Other
- Writing direction: Left-to-Right

I with ogonek (majuscule: Į, minuscule: į) is a letter of the Latin alphabet formed by addition of the ogonek to the letter I. It is used in Lithuanian, Western Apache, Chipewyan, Mescalero-Chiricahua, Muscogee, Dadibi, Dalecarlian, Gwichʼin, Hän, Iñapari, Kaska, Navajo, Sierra Otomi, Sekani, Tagish, Tlingit, Tutchone, Winnebago, Assiniboine, Mandan, Osage, Tutelo, Catawba, and Ixtlán Zapotec.

== Usage ==
In Lithuanian, it is the 14th letter of the alphabet, and is pronounced as long close front unrounded vowel ([iː]). In the past, the letter was used to denote the nasalized close front unrounded vowel ([ĩ]). Currently, it appears in the words that used to be nasalized in the past, for example in įkalnė, which means uphill.

⟨Į⟩ was also used in the Latin alphabet of the Khakas language between 1929–1939, representing the sound /ɘ/. The current Cyrillic alphabet uses the dotted I for the same sound.

The letter also appears in various Indigenous languages of North America, which are: Western Apache, Chipewyan, Mescalero-Chiricahua, Muscogee, Dadibi, Dalecarlian, Gwichʼin, Hän, Iñapari, Kaska, Navajo, Sierra Otomi, Sekani, Tagish, Tlingit, Tutchone, Winnebago, Assiniboine, Mandan, Osage, Tutelo, Catawba, and Ixtlán Zapotec. In most of them, the letter represents the nasalized close front unrounded vowel ([ĩ]).

== Encoding ==
Character information
Preview	Į		į	
Unicode name	LATIN CAPITAL LETTER I WITH OGONEK		LATIN SMALL LETTER I WITH OGONEK	
Encodings	decimal	hex	dec	hex
Unicode	302	U+012E	303	U+012F
UTF-8	196 174	C4 AE	196 175	C4 AF
Numeric character reference	&#302;	&#x12E;	&#303;	&#x12F;
Named character reference	&Iogon;		&iogon;	
