= Ķ =

Latin letter K with cedilla

K with cedilla

Ķ, ķ (k-cedilla) is the 17th letter of the Latvian alphabet.

In Latvian, it represents a voiceless palatal plosive, represented in the IPA with /c/. In ISO 9, Ķ is the official Latin transliteration of the Cyrillic letter Қ.

== History ==
Proposed in 1908 as part of the new Latvian spelling by the scientific commission headed by K. Mīlenbahs, it was accepted and began to be taught in schools in 1909. Prior to that, Latvian had been written in German Fraktur.
