= Slovak Braille =

Braille alphabet of the Slovak language

- Script type: alphabet
- Print basis: Slovak alphabet
- Languages: Slovak

Related scripts
- Parent systems: Braille: Czechoslovak Braille; Slovak Braille

Slovak Braille is the braille alphabet for Slovak. Like braille for other languages using the Latin script, Slovak Braille assigns the 26 basic Latin letters the same as Louis Braille's original assignments for French Braille.

== Slovak Braille chart ==
Slovak Braille is as follows:

| ⠀ (braille pattern blank) | a | á | ä, @ | b | c | č | d | ď | e | é |
| f | g | h | i | í | j | k | l | ĺ | ľ | m |
| n | ň | o | ó | ô | p | q | r | ŕ | s | š |
| t | ť | u | ú | v | w | x | y | ý | z | ž |
| , | ; | : | . | ? | ! | " | ( | -, − | ) | |
| ' | = | / | * | Cap. | l.c. | Greek | | | | |

That is, it is Czech Braille with the following additions:

| ä | ĺ | ľ | ŕ |

The Czech ů is ô in Slovak. Unlike in the Czech Braille, the letter w has its international value.
