= Code page 912 =

Computer character set for Central European languages

Code page 912 (CCSID 912) (also known as CP 912, IBM 00912) is a code page used under IBM AIX and DOS to write the Albanian, Bosnian, Croatian, Czech, English, German, Hungarian, Polish, Romanian, Serbian (Latin alphabet), Slovak, and Slovene languages. It is an extension of ISO/IEC 8859-2, though prior to 1999, the code page matched ISO/IEC 8859-2 exactly.

== Code page layout ==
In the following table, characters are shown together with their corresponding Unicode code points. Only the second half is shown, code points 0-127 are the same as code page 437.

Code page 912
	0	1	2	3	4	5	6	7	8	9	A	B	C	D	E	F
8x	░	▒	▓	│	┤	┘	┌	█	©	╣	║	╗	╝	¢	¥	┐
9x	└	┴	┬	├	─	┼	▄	▀	╚	╔	╩	╦	╠	═	╬	®
Ax	NBSP	Ą	˘	Ł	¤	Ľ	Ś	§	¨	Š	Ş	Ť	Ź	SHY	Ž	Ż
Bx	°	ą	˛	ł	´	ľ	ś	ˇ	¸	š	ş	ť	ź	˝	ž	ż
Cx	Ŕ	Á	Â	Ă	Ä	Ĺ	Ć	Ç	Č	É	Ę	Ë	Ě	Í	Î	Ď
Dx	Đ	Ń	Ň	Ó	Ô	Ő	Ö	×	Ř	Ů	Ú	Ű	Ü	Ý	Ţ	ß
Ex	ŕ	á	â	ă	ä	ĺ	ć	ç	č	é	ę	ë	ě	í	î	ď
Fx	đ	ń	ň	ó	ô	ő	ö	÷	ř	ů	ú	ű	ü	ý	ţ	˙
