= Czech Braille =

Braille alphabet of the Czech language

Czech Braille Slovak Braille
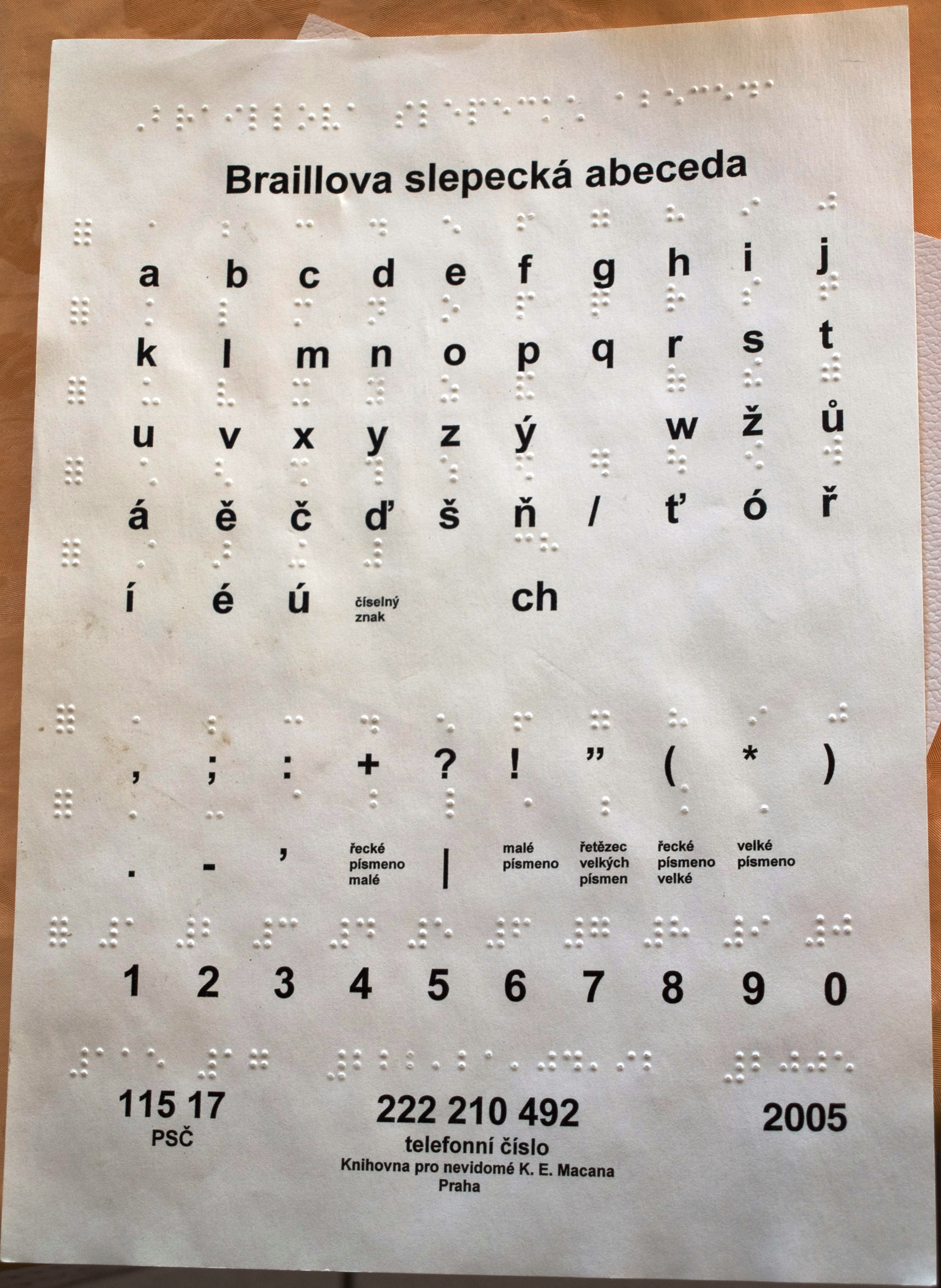
- Script type: alphabet
- Print basis: Czech alphabet
- Languages: Czech

Related scripts
- Parent systems: Braille: Czechoslovak Braille; Czech Braille

Czech Braille is the braille alphabet of the Czech language. Like braille in other Latin-script languages, Czech Braille assigns the 25 basic Latin letters (not including "W") the same as Louis Braille's original assignments for French.

== Czech Braille chart ==
With the exception of w, Czech follows international norms for the basic letters of the alphabet.

a, 1	á	b, 2	c, 3	č	d, 4	ď	e, 5	é	ě	f, 6	g, 7
h, 8	i, 9	í	j, 0	k	l	m	n	ň	o	ó	p, %
q	r, ‰	ř	s	š	t	ť	u	ú, §	ů	v	w
x	y	ý	z	ž	⠀ (braille pattern blank)	.	,	:	;	or −	+
/	?	!	"	(	)	*	’	|	(Cap)	(CAPS)	(l.c.)

For letters with diacritics, there are two common strategies: (1) a dot 6 may be added (á, č, ď), or (2) the letter is reversed (ň, ó, ř, š, ť, ú, ý, ž). The Czech braille letter ř is the international form for w, so w has been assigned an idiosyncratic form, which is the reverse of ů. Í is a stretched i. É and ě are not derived from e, but are the reverse of each other.

a	c	d	e		i	n	o	r	s	t	u		v	y	z
á	č	ď	é	ě	í	ň	ó	ř	š	ť	ú	ů	w	ý	ž

The numerical prefix, ⠼, derives the second options in the table (the digits, %, ‰, §). ⠠ indicates a capital letter, ⠰ that a word is in all caps, and ⠐ indicates lower case. There are also prefixes for small and capital Greek letters, ⠘ and ⠨.

== Slovak Braille ==
Slovak Braille is similar. Ô is equivalent to Czech Braille ů, and it does not have the letters ě or ř. In addition, there are four letters not found in Czech Braille:

ä	ĺ	ľ	ŕ
