= Windows-1250 =

Windows character set for Central European languages

- MIME / IANA: windows-1250
- Alias(es): cp1250 (Code page 1250)
- Languages: Czech, Polish, Slovak, Hungarian, Slovene, Serbo-Croatian (Latin script), Montenegrin, Romanian (before 1993 spelling reform), Turkmen, Rotokas, Albanian, English, German, Irish, Luxembourgish, Dutch
- Created by: Microsoft
- Standard: WHATWG Encoding Standard
- Classification: extended ASCII, Windows-125x
- Other related encoding: ISO-8859-2

Windows-1250 is a code page used under Microsoft Windows to represent texts in Central European and Eastern European languages that use the Latin script. It is primarily used by Czech. It is also used for Polish (as can Windows-1257), Slovak, Hungarian, Slovene (as can Windows-1257), Serbo-Croatian (Latin script), Romanian (before a 1993 spelling reform) and Albanian (as can Windows-1252). It may also be used with the German language, though it is missing uppercase ẞ. (Note: In 2017, the Council for German Orthography officially adopted a capital, ⟨ẞ⟩, before support for German was complete. Fully compatible with ISO/IEC 8859-1 for German texts.) German-language texts encoded with Windows-1250 and Windows-1252 are identical.

This has been replaced by UTF-8 far more than Windows-1252 has. As of March 2025, less than 0.05% of all web pages use Windows-1250.

Windows-1250 is similar to ISO-8859-2 and has all the printable characters it has and more. However, a few of them are rearranged (unlike Windows-1252, which keeps all printable characters from ISO-8859-1 in the same place). Most of the rearrangements seem to have been done to keep characters shared with Windows-1252 in the same place but three of the characters moved (Ą, Ľ, ź) cannot be explained this way, since those do not occur in Windows-1252 and could have been put in the same positions as in ISO-8859-2 if ˇ had been put e.g. at 98.

IBM uses code page 1250 (CCSID 1250 and euro sign extended CCSID 5346) for Windows-1250.

== Character set ==
The following table shows Windows-1250. Each character is shown with its Unicode equivalent.

Windows-1250
	0	1	2	3	4	5	6	7	8	9	A	B	C	D	E	F
0x	NUL	SOH	STX	ETX	EOT	ENQ	ACK	BEL	BS	HT	LF	VT	FF	CR	SO	SI
1x	DLE	DC1	DC2	DC3	DC4	NAK	SYN	ETB	CAN	EM	SUB	ESC	FS	GS	RS	US
2x	SP	!	"	#	$	%	&	'	(	)	*	+	,	-	.	/
3x	0	1	2	3	4	5	6	7	8	9	:	;	<	=	>	?
4x	@	A	B	C	D	E	F	G	H	I	J	K	L	M	N	O
5x	P	Q	R	S	T	U	V	W	X	Y	Z	[	\	]		_
6x	`	a	b	c	d	e	f	g	h	i	j	k	l	m	n	o
7x	p	q	r	s	t	u	v	w	x	y	z	{	|	}	~	DEL
8x	€		‚		„	…	†	‡		‰	Š	‹	Ś	Ť	Ž	Ź
9x		‘	’	“	”	•	–	—		™	š	›	ś	ť	ž	ź
Ax	NBSP	ˇ	˘	Ł	¤	Ą	¦	§	¨	©	Ş	«	¬	SHY	®	Ż
Bx	°	±	˛	ł	´	µ	¶	·	¸	ą	ş	»	Ľ	˝	ľ	ż
Cx	Ŕ	Á	Â	Ă	Ä	Ĺ	Ć	Ç	Č	É	Ę	Ë	Ě	Í	Î	Ď
Dx	Đ	Ń	Ň	Ó	Ô	Ő	Ö	×	Ř	Ů	Ú	Ű	Ü	Ý	Ţ	ß
Ex	ŕ	á	â	ă	ä	ĺ	ć	ç	č	é	ę	ë	ě	í	î	ď
Fx	đ	ń	ň	ó	ô	ő	ö	÷	ř	ů	ú	ű	ü	ý	ţ	˙

Different from ISO-8859-2
Different from Windows-1252 to match ISO-8859-2
Different from both Windows-1252 and ISO-8859-2

== See also ==
- Latin script in Unicode
- Unicode
- Universal Character Set
  - European Unicode subset (DIN 91379)
- UTF-8
- Kodowanie polskich znaków
