= Windows-1252 =

Windows character set for Latin alphabet

- MIME / IANA: windows-1252
- Alias(es): cp1252 (code page 1252)
- Languages: All supported by ISO/IEC 8859-1 plus full support for French (Note: Excluding the narrow non-breaking space, which is preferred to the regular non-breaking space when spacing certain kinds of punctuation.) and Finnish and ligature forms for English; e.g. Danish (except for a rare exceptional letter), Irish, Italian, Norwegian, Portuguese, Spanish, Swedish, German (missing uppercase ẞ (Note: uppercase ẞ was not officially adopted until 2017)), Icelandic, Faroese, Luxembourgish, Albanian, Estonian, Swahili, Tswana, Catalan, Basque, Occitan, Rotokas, Toki Pona, Lojban, Romansh, Dutch (except the Ĳ/ĳ character, substituted by IJ/ij or ÿ), and Slovene (except the č character, substituted by ç).
- Created by: Microsoft
- Standard: WHATWG Encoding Standard
- Classification: extended ASCII, Windows-125x
- Extends: ISO 8859-1 (excluding C1 controls)
- Transforms / Encodes: ISO 8859-15
- Succeeded by: Unicode (UTF-8, UTF-16)

Windows-1252 or CP-1252 (Windows code page 1252) is a legacy single-byte character encoding that is used by default (as the "ANSI code page") in Microsoft Windows throughout the Americas, Western Europe, Oceania, and much of Africa.

Initially the same as ISO 8859-1, it began to diverge starting in Windows 2.0 by adding additional characters in the 0x80 to 0x9F (hex) range (the ISO standards reserve this range for C1 control codes). Notable additional characters include curly quotation marks and all printable characters from ISO 8859-15.

It is the most-used single-byte character encoding in the world. As of November 2026 (effectively) 8.5% of static web pages are served as Windows-1252 (and even more used of some subtypes or categories, see below). This contrasts a lot with only 0.2% of all websites declared using Windows-1252 even when adding the 0.8% declared to use ISO 8859-1, which is treated as Windows-1252 by all modern browsers (as required by the HTML5 standard), for a total of 1.0%, explained by the fact most web sites are served programmatically and/or usually with a mix of static pages. Almost all websites now use the multi-byte character encoding UTF-8, another superset of ASCII. Some countries or languages show a higher usage than the global average, in 2026 Brazil according to website use, use is at 1.4%, and in Germany at 1.8%. (these are the sums of ISO-8859-1 and CP-1252 declarations).

HTML5 is the latest standard that almost all web pages use, but regarding older standards: 6.0% of HTML Transitional web pages use Windows-1252 (HTML Transitional is used by 2.9% of all the websites). For the obsolete and little used frameset site element using websites (0.2% of all), 12.8% use Windows-1252. So it can be said that these legacy encodings are more used with older technology, and HTML5 mostly eliminate their use, and pre-HTML5-based HTML Transitional and HTML Strict.

== Name ==
It is known to Windows by the code page number 1252, and by the IANA-approved name "windows-1252".

Historically, the phrase "ANSI Code Page" was used in Windows to refer to non-DOS encodings; the intention was that most of these would be ANSI standards such as ISO-8859-1. Even though Windows-1252 was the first and by far most popular code page named so in Microsoft Windows parlance, the code page has never been an ANSI standard. Microsoft explains, "The term ANSI as used to signify Windows code pages is a historical reference, but is nowadays a misnomer that continues to persist in the Windows community."

LaTeX can input Windows-1252 by using inputenc.sty with parameter ansinew (and more recently cp1252).

IBM uses code page 1252 (CCSID 1252 and euro sign extended CCSID 5348) for Windows-1252.

It is called "WE8MSWIN1252" by Oracle Database.

== History ==
- The first version of the codepage was used in Microsoft Windows 1.0. It matched the ISO-8859-1 standard (including leaving code points 0xD7 and 0xF7 undefined, as they were not in the standard at that time).
- The second version of the codepage was introduced in Microsoft Windows 2.0. In this version, code points 0xD7, 0xF7, 0x91, and 0x92 are defined.
- The third version of the codepage was introduced in Microsoft Windows 3.1. It defined all code points used in the final version except the euro sign and the Z with caron character pair.
- The final version (shown below) was introduced in Microsoft Windows 98.

Starting in the 1990s, many Microsoft products that could produce HTML included Windows-1252-exclusive characters, but marked the encoding as ISO-8859-1, ASCII, or undeclared. Characters exclusive to Windows-1252 would render incorrectly on non-Windows operating systems (often as question marks). In particular, typographers' quotes—curly variants of the standard straight apostrophes and quotation marks in US-ASCII—were commonly used in files produced in Windows applications such as Microsoft Word due to the smart quotes feature, which can automatically convert straight apostrophes and quotation marks to the curly variants. To fix this, by 2000 most web browsers and e-mail clients treated the charsets ISO-8859-1 and US-ASCII as Windows-1252—this behavior is now required by the HTML5 specification. Undeclared charsets in HTML are also assumed to be Windows-1252.

Although Windows NT supported Unicode and attempted to encourage programs to use it, it only provided the 16-bit code units of UCS-2/UTF-16, despite the existing support for other multibyte character encodings such as Shift-JIS. As many applications preferred to use 8-bit strings, Windows-1252 remained the most popular encoding on Windows. UTF-8 has been supported since Windows 10 so this is gradually changing.

== Code page layout ==
The following table shows Windows-1252. Differences from ISO-8859-1 have the Unicode code point number below the character, based on the Unicode.org mapping of Windows-1252 with "best fit". A tooltip, generally available only when one points to the immediate right of the character, shows the Unicode code point name and the decimal Alt code.

Windows-1252 (CP1252)
	0	1	2	3	4	5	6	7	8	9	A	B	C	D	E	F
0_	NUL	SOH	STX	ETX	EOT	ENQ	ACK	BEL	BS	HT	LF	VT	FF	CR	SO	SI
1_	DLE	DC1	DC2	DC3	DC4	NAK	SYN	ETB	CAN	EM	SUB	ESC	FS	GS	RS	US
2_	SP	!	"	#	$	%	&	'	(	)	*	+	,	-	.	/
3_	0	1	2	3	4	5	6	7	8	9	:	;	<	=	>	?
4_	@	A	B	C	D	E	F	G	H	I	J	K	L	M	N	O
5_	P	Q	R	S	T	U	V	W	X	Y	Z	[	\	]		_
6_	`	a	b	c	d	e	f	g	h	i	j	k	l	m	n	o
7_	p	q	r	s	t	u	v	w	x	y	z	{	|	}	~	DEL
8_	€ 20AC		‚ 201A	ƒ 0192	„ 201E	… 2026	† 2020	‡ 2021	ˆ 02C6	‰ 2030	Š 0160	‹ 2039	Œ 0152		Ž 017D	
9_		‘ 2018	’ 2019	“ 201C	” 201D	• 2022	– 2013	— 2014	˜ 02DC	™ 2122	š 0161	› 203A	œ 0153		ž 017E	Ÿ 0178
A_	NBSP	¡	¢	£	¤	¥	¦	§	¨	©	ª	«	¬	SHY	®	¯
B_	°	±	²	³	´	µ	¶	·	¸	¹	º	»	¼	½	¾	¿
C_	À	Á	Â	Ã	Ä	Å	Æ	Ç	È	É	Ê	Ë	Ì	Í	Î	Ï
D_	Ð	Ñ	Ò	Ó	Ô	Õ	Ö	×	Ø	Ù	Ú	Û	Ü	Ý	Þ	ß
E_	à	á	â	ã	ä	å	æ	ç	è	é	ê	ë	ì	í	î	ï
F_	ð	ñ	ò	ó	ô	õ	ö	÷	ø	ù	ú	û	ü	ý	þ	ÿ

According to the information on Microsoft's and the Unicode Consortium's websites, positions 81, 8D, 8F, 90, and 9D are unused; however, the "best fit" mappings and Windows API MultiByteToWideChar map these to the corresponding C1 control codes.

== Related encodings ==
=== OS/2 extensions ===
The OS/2 operating system supports an encoding by the name of Code page 1004 (CCSID 1004) or "Windows Extended". This mostly matches code page 1252, with the exception of certain C0 control characters being replaced by diacritic characters.

Code page 1004 (differing rows only)
	0	1	2	3	4	5	6	7	8	9	A	B	C	D	E	F
0_	NUL	SOH	STX	ETX	ˉ 02C9	˘ 02D8	˙ 02D9	BEL	˚ 02DA	HT	˝ 02DD	˛ 02DB	ˇ 02C7	CR	SO	SI

=== MS-DOS extensions (rare) ===
There is a rarely used, but useful, graphics extended code page 1252 where codes 0x00 to 0x1f allow for box drawing as used in applications such as MSDOS Edit and Codeview. One of the applications to use this code page was an Intel Corporation Install/Recovery disk image utility from mid/late 1995. These programs were written for its P6 User Test Program machines (US example). It was used exclusively in its then EMEA region (Europe, Middle East & Africa). In time the programs were changed to use code page 850.

Graphics Extended Code Page 1252
	0	1	2	3	4	5	6	7	8	9	A	B	C	D	E	F
0_	○	■	↑	↓	→	←	║	═	╔	╗	╚	╝	░	▒	►	◄
1_	│	─	┌	┐	└	┘	├	┤	┴	┬	♦	┼	█	▄	▀	▬

== See also ==
- Latin script in Unicode
- Unicode
- Universal Coded Character Set
  - European Unicode subset (DIN 91379)
- UTF-8
- Western Latin character sets (computing)
- Windows-1250
- Windows code pages
- ISO/IEC JTC 1/SC 2
- Extended ASCII
