= Slovak declension =

Declensions in the Slovak language

Slovak, like most Slavic languages and Latin, is an inflected language, meaning that the endings (and sometimes also the stems) of most words (nouns, adjectives, pronouns and numerals) change depending on the given combination of the grammatical gender, the grammatical number and the grammatical case of the particular word in the particular sentence.

== Legend ==
- "ends in" in the following refers to the ending in the nominative singular (N sg), unless stated differently;
- Soft consonants are: all consonants with the diacritic mark ˇ (for example š, ľ) + c, dz, j. Hard and neutral consonants are all the remaining consonants;
- For masculine nouns, adjectives, pronouns and numerals it is necessary to distinguish between animate and inanimate ones. An animate noun is a person (for example father, Peter) and an inanimate noun is any other noun (for example table, fear, democracy). Animals are usually viewed as persons only in sg. For the animate nouns, the G is identical with the A (both in sg. and in pl.), and for the inanimate nouns, the N is identical with the A (both in sg. and in pl.). Animate/Inanimate adjectives, pronouns and numerals are those referring to an animate/inanimate noun respectively (for example in "my father" the "my" is animate, because father is animate);
- sg = singular, pl = plural;
- N, G, D, A, L, I are abbreviations of grammatical cases (see above).

== Nouns ==
There are four grammatical genders in Slovak: animate masculine, inanimate masculine, feminine, and neuter. In popular description, the first two genders are often covered under common masculine gender. Almost all Slovak nouns and adjectives, as well as some pronouns and numerals can be categorized into one of these genders. Exceptions are pluralia tantum (Vianoce – Christmas, though there are rules for deriving the gender), words that are drifting into another gender and are currently neuter (knieža – prince), and masculine animals that are animate in singular and mostly inanimate in plural.

For each gender, there are four basic declension paradigms, i.e. declension models.

Like in English, Slovak has singular and plural nouns. Morphological traces of the ancient Indo-European dual number remain, but are not a separate grammar category anymore. A particular case is associated with three distinct groups of numerals associated with nouns:

- 1 (one) – nominative case singular, for example jeden dub (one oak)
- 2, 3, 4 – nominative case plural, for example dva duby (two oaks)
- 0, 5 and more – genitive case plural, for example päť dubov (five [of] oaks)

Note that many nouns (especially those following the paradigm chlap) have different endings than those of the paradigms in one or more grammatical cases. They are neither defined, nor listed in the following. The complete number of different paradigms for nouns is somewhere around 200.

A very small number of foreign nouns are not declined, i.e. the stem and ending never change.

=== The Masculine Gender ===
	Animate				Inanimate			
	Ends in anything except -a		Ends in -a		Ends in a hard/neutral consonant		Ends in a soft consonant	
	singular	plural	singular	plural	singular	plural	singular	plural
Nominative	chlap	chlapi	hrdina	hrdinovia	dub	duby	stroj	stroje
Accusative	chlap-a	chlap-ov	hrdin-u	hrdin-ov	dub	duby	stroj	stroje
Genitive	chlap-a	chlap-ov	hrdin-u	hrdin-ov	dub-a	dub-ov	stroj-a	stroj-ov
Dative	chlapovi	chlapom	hrdinovi	hrdinom	dubu	dubom	stroju	strojom
Locative	chlapovi	chlapoch	hrdinovi	hrdinoch	dube	duboch	stroji	strojoch
Instrumental	chlapom	chlapmi	hrdinom	hrdinami	dubom	dubmi	strojom	strojmi

There is also a 5th paradigm for foreign nouns ending in .-i, -y, -e, -í, -é, -ě, -ä (for example pony, kuli, Tököli, Goethe, Krejčí, abbé, Poupě) and foreign personal names ending in -ü, -ö (for example Jenö), which goes as follows:

- Sg: N: pony, G: ponyho, D: ponymu, A: ponyho, L and I: ponym;
- Pl: like hrdina.

Masculine animal nouns are declined like chlap in the singular, but in plural usually like dub (if they end in a hard or neutral consonant) or like stroj (otherwise).

Notes on chlap:

- For the nouns ending in a vowel (for example -o, -u) the vowel is not part of the stem, but the ending in N sg: for example dedo has G / D sg... deda / dedovi etc. (not *dedoa / *dedoovi etc.)
- many nouns lose an e / o / i from the stem in all cases except N sg (for example vrabec – vrabca);
- in some short nouns, the -e- changes its position in all cases except N sg (for example žnec – ženca);
- some nouns ending in -k / -ch change their final /k/ or /ch/ into /c/ and /s/, respectively in N pl (for example žiak – žiaci);
- words ending in -h use the N pl ending for hrdina instead (such as vrah - vrahovia, súdruh - súdruhovia)
- most Latin and Greek nouns ending in -us, -as, -es lose it in all cases except N sg (for example génius – génia; but for example fiškus – fiškusa).

Notes on hrdina:

Notes on dub:

- many nouns lose e / o / i / í / ie / á from the stem in all cases except N sg and A sg (for example výmysel – výmyslu, chrbát – chrbta, ohníček – ohníčka, dnešok – dneška, ocot – octu )
- some Greek and Latin nouns in -us, -es, -os lose the -us / -es / -os in all cases except N sg and A sg (e.g. komunizmus – komunizmu; but e.g. autobus – autobusu, cirkus – cirkusu);
- some Slovak words lose the acute or the i / u from a diphthong in all cases except N sg and A sg (for example mráz – mraza, chlieb – chleba, vietor – vetra (here along with loss of o), stôl – stola; but bôr – bôru);
- in G sg, inanimate masculine nouns declined by the pattern dub have the ending of either -a or -u. There is no quick rule to tell which noun uses which ending.
- in G pl, some nouns change the a / e / i / o / u (without an acute or a preceding i) in the stem to á / ie / í / ô / ú (Krompachy – Krompách, Žabokreky – Žabokriek, Poniky – Poník, sloha – slôh) or in some cases to ia / iu (for example čas – čias, Margecany – Margecian), unless the rhythmical rule prevents it, i.e. the preceding syllable in the stem already contains a vowel with an acute or a diphthong (for example Hájniky – Hájnik);
- in L sg, nouns ending in g / k / h have -u rather than -e.

Notes on stroj:

- many nouns lose the e / o / i / í / ie / á in all cases except N sg and A sg (for example marec – marca, delenec – delenca, veniec – venca, deň – dňa, stupeň – stupňa, lakeť – lakťa);
- some nouns lose the acute or the i/u from a diphthong in all cases except N sg and A sg (for example dážď – dažďa, nôž – noža);
- in G pl, geographical names in pl. (plurale tantum) change the a / e / i / o / u (without an acute or a preceding i) in the stem to á / é / í / ó / ú (for example Tlmače – Tlmáč) or in some cases to ia / ie / iu / ô (for example Ladce – Ladiec) in the G pl, unless the rhythmical rule prevents it, i.e. the preceding syllable in the stem already contains an acute or a diphthong.

=== The Feminine Gender ===
	Ends in hard/neutral consonant + a		Ends in -soft consonant + a (or in -ia / -ya)		Ends in a consonant (other than those in the next column).		Ends in -c / s / p / v / sť	
	singular	plural	singular	plural	singular	plural	singular	plural
Nominative	žena	ženy	ulica	ulice	dlaň	dlane	kosť	kosti
Accusative	ženu	ženy	ulicu	ulice	dlaň	dlane	kosť	kosti
Genitive	ženy	žien	ulice	ulíc	dlane	dlaní	kosti	kostí
Dative	žene	ženám	ulici	uliciam	dlani	dlaniam	kosti	kostiam
Locative	žene	ženách	ulici	uliciach	dlani	dlaniach	kosti	kostiach
Instrumental	ženou	ženami	ulicou	ulicami	dlaňou	dlaňami	kosťou	kosťami

There is also a 5th paradigm for feminine nouns ending in -ná or -ovná (for example princezná), where the singular and N pl and A pl are like pekná (see under adjectives) and the remaining plural is like žena. In the G pl, there are changes in the stem: if the noun ends in -vowel + ná, then this vowel receives an acute (for example švagriná – švagrín), but otherwise -ie- is inserted (for example princezná – princezien).

There is also a 6th paradigm for the feminine nouns ending in -ea (idea, Kórea), which goes like žena, except that D sg and L sg are idei, and G pl is ideí without change in the stem.

Notes on žena:

- The following nouns are declined like ulica instead of žena: večera, rozopra, konopa, Hybe and (the plurale tantum) dvere;
- In the G pl of some nouns, an ie / e / o / á / ô is inserted in the last syllable of the stem (for example hra – hier, čipka – čipiek/čipôk, karta – kariet/karát, kvapka – kvapiek/kvapák/kvapôk, vojna – vojen, látka – látok);
- In the G pl of some nouns, in the last syllable of the stem the a / i / y / u / ä / e / o / syllabic r / syllabic l (without an acute or a preceding i) is changed into á (or ia) / í / ý / ú / ia / ie / ô / ŕ / ĺ respectively (sila - síl, skala - skál, chyba – chýb, ruka – rúk, fakulta – fakúlt, päta – piat, slza – sĺz, črta – čŕt, brzda – bŕzd, slza – sĺz).

Notes on ulica:

- In the G pl of some nouns ie is inserted (for example jedľa – jedieľ, sukňa – sukieň);
- In the G pl of some nouns, in the last syllable of the stem the a / i / y / u / e / o / syllabic r (without an acute or a preceding i) is changed into á (or ia) / í / ý / ú / ie / ô / ŕ respectively (for example ulica – ulíc, sudkyňa – sudkýň, Krkonoše – Krkonôš, košeľa – košieľ, guľa – gúľ, hoľa – hôľ, fľaša – fliaš).

Notes on dlaň:

- The following nouns are declined like dlaň, not like kosť: obec, päsť, čeľusť;
- The following feminine nouns are not declined like dlaň, but like kosť: jar, zver, chuť, ortuť, pamäť, smrť, pleť, sneť, rukoväť, smeť, púť, spleť, svojeť, reč, seč, meď, soľ, hluš, myš, voš, lož, bel, Sereď, Sibír, Budapešť, Bukurešť, Lešť and a few other nouns. The words myseľ, chuť, raž, tvár, hneď can be declined like dlaň or like kosť in the singular, but only like dlaň in the plural. The word hrsť is declined like dlaň in the singular, but like kosť in the plural. The word pamäť is declined like kosť when it refers to human memory, but like dlaň when it refers to computer memory;
- most nouns in -eň lose -e- in all cases except N sg and A sg (for example úroveň – úrovne).

Notes on kosť:

- see the first two notes under dlaň;
- some nouns lose -e-/-o- in all cases except N sg and A sg (for example ves – vsi, lož – lži, cirkev – cirkvi).

=== The Neuter Gender ===
	Ends in - o		Ends in - e (except -ie)		Ends in - ie		Ends in - a or -ä	
	singular	plural	singular	plural	singular	plural	singular	plural
Nominative, accusative	mesto	mestá	srdce	srdcia	vysvedčenie	vysvedčenia	dievča	dievčatá/dievčence
Genitive	mesta	miest	srdca	sŕdc	vysvedčenia	vysvedčení	dievčaťa	dievčiat/dievčeniec
Dative	mestu	mestám	srdcu	srdciam	vysvedčeniu	vysvedčeniam	dievčaťu	dievčatám/dievčencom
Locative	meste	mestách	srdci	srdciach	vysvedčení	vysvedčeniach	dievčati	dievčatách/dievčencoch
Instrumental	mestom	mestami	srdcom	srdcami	vysvedčením	vysvedčeniami	dievčaťom	dievčatami/dievčencami

For (any) neuter nouns ending in -vowel+um/on (for example štúdium, ganglion) there is actually a 5th paradigm (štúdium), which is declined like mesto except that the -um- / -on- is omitted in all cases except N sg and A sg., L sg ends in -u (štúdiu), and G pl in -í (štúdií).

Notes on mesto:

- Latin and Greek neuter nouns ending in consonant + -um/-on (for example fórum, epiteton) are declined like mesto, except that the -um/-on is omitted in all cases except N sg and A sg (for example, N sg and A sg: publikum, G sg: publika, D sg: publiku etc.);
- in the G pl of some nouns, an ie / e / o / á / (rarely é) is inserted in the last syllable of the stem (for example clo – ciel, mydlo –mydiel, zvieratko – zvieratiek, jedlo – jedál, vrecko – vrecák/vreciek, vlákno – vláken/vlákien, číslo – čísel / čísiel, lajno – lajen, lýtko – lýtok, teliesko – teliesok;
- in the G pl of some nouns, in the last syllable of the stem, the a / i / y / u / ä / e / o / syllabic r / syllabic l (without an acute or a preceding i) is changed into á / í / ý / ú / ia / ie / ô / ŕ / ĺ respectively (kladivo – kladív, zrno – zŕn).

Notes on srdce:

- In the G pl of some nouns, an ie/e is inserted in the last syllable of the stem (for example citoslovce – citosloviec, okience – okienec, vajce – vajec);
- In the G pl of some nouns, in the last syllable of the stem the a / i / y / u / ä / e / o / syllabic r / syllabic l (without an acute or a preceding i) is changed into á / í / ý / ú / ia / ie / ô / ŕ / ĺ respectively (plece – pliec, srdce – sŕdc, slnce – sĺnc).

Notes on vysvedčenie:

Notes on dievča:

- The -a- at the beginning of all endings is replaced by ä after a labial consonant, i.e. p/b/m/f/v (for example žriebä – žriebäťa – žriebäťu...);
- Most nouns can take both the -at- endings and the -enc- endings in the plural (for example dievča, húsa, bábä), some nouns however take only the -at- endings (for example knieža, zviera, mláďa) and some nouns only the -enc- endings (for example kura). The following nouns do not take the -en- in the alternative plural endings: prasa (N pl prasatá/prasce, G pl prasiat/prasiec), teľa, šteňa.

== Adjectives ==
=== Paradigms ===
==== Pekný ====
This paradigm is used for adjectives ending in a hard or neutral consonant + ý [in masculine]

	Singular				Plural	
	Masculine	Masculine Animate	Neuter	Feminine	Masculine Animate	Others
Nominative	pekný		pekné	pekná	pekní	pekné
Accusative	pekný	pekného	pekné	peknú	pekných	pekné
Genitive	pekného			peknej	pekných	
Dative	peknému			peknej	pekným	
Locative	peknom			peknej	pekných	
Instrumental	pekným			peknou	peknými	

==== Cudzí ====
This paradigm is used for adjectives ending in a soft consonant + í [in masculine] (including the comparative and superlative, see below);

Forms: They are like with pekný, but within the endings (i.e. in what follows after pekn-) always replace ý by í, é by ie, á by ia, and ú by iu., e.g.: pekný – cudzí, pekné(ho) – cudzie(ho), pekný(m) – cudzí(m), pekná – cudzia, peknú – cudziu.

==== Otcov ====
This paradigm is used for adjectives ending in -ov / -in, for example otcov ("father's"), matkin ("mother's"). All of them are possessive adjectives (adjectives in -ov are derived from masculine nouns, adjectives in -in – from feminine nouns).

	Singular				Plural	
	Masculine	Masculine Animate	Neuter	Feminine	Masculine Animate	Others
Nominative	otcov		otcovo	otcova	otcovi	otcove
Accusative	otcov	otcovho	otcovo	otcovu	otcových	otcove
Genitive	otcovho			otcovej	otcových	
Dative	otcovmu			otcovej	otcovým	
Locative	otcovom			otcovej	otcových	
Instrumental	otcovým			otcovou	otcovými	

=== The Comparative and Superlative ===
The comparative is formed by replacing the adjective ending -ý/y/i/í by -ejší or -ší. There are exact rules for the choice between these two endings and there are several irregular comparatives. Examples:

Regular: hrozný – hroznejší, bohatý – bohatší…
Irregular: veľký – väčší, malý – menší, dobrý – lepší, zlý – horší, pekný – krajší, čierny – černejší, blízky – bližší, ďaleký – ďaľší, hlboký – hlbší…

The comparative forms are declined like cudzí.

The superlative is formed as follows: naj+comparative. Examples: pekný – krajší – najkrajší, hrozný – hroznejší – najhroznejší...

The comparative and superlative of adverbs (which, by the way, end in -o, -e or -y in the basic form) is formed by simply replacing the -(ej)ší from the adjective by -(ej)šie (for example: pekne – krajšie – najkrajšie, hrozne – hroznejšie – najhroznejšie, teplo – teplejšie – najteplejšie, pomaly – pomalšie – najpomalšie).

== Pronouns ==
=== Personal pronouns ===
	Singular					Plural			
	First	Second	Third			First	Second	Third	
	I	you	he	it	she	we	you	they (masculine animate, or mixed genders with at least one masculine animate)	they (otherwise)
Nominative	ja	ty	on	ono	ona	my	vy	oni	ony
Accusative	ma (mňa)	ťa (teba)	ho (jeho, neho, -ňho, -ň, -eň)	ho (-ň, -eň)	ju (ňu)	nás	vás	ich (nich)	ich (ne)
Genitive	ma (mňa)	ťa (teba)	ho (jeho, neho,-ňho, -ň)		jej (nej)	nás	vás	ich (nich)	ich (nich)
Dative	mne (mi)	tebe (ti)	mu (jemu, nemu,-ňmu)		jej (nej)	nám	vám	im (nim)	
Locative	mne	tebe	ňom		nej	nás	vás	nich	
Instrumental	mnou	tebou	ním		ňou	nami	vami	nimi	

There is also the reflexive pronoun sa, which is declined as follows: N: –, G: seba, D: sebe / si, A: seba/sa, L: sebe, I: sebou

Notes:

- the long forms mňa, teba, seba, mne, tebe, sebe in G, D and A are used after prepositions (for example pre mňa) or when emphasized, especially always at the beginning of the sentence (for example Vidíš len seba., Teba vidím.);
- the forms jeho, jemu in G, D and A are used when emphasized, especially always at the beginning of the sentence (for example Vidím jeho. Jeho vidím = It is him that I see);
- the forms in n- (i.e. neho, nemu, nej, ňu, nich, nim, ne) are used after prepositions (for example pre neho (masc.)); the forms -ňho (or -ň), -ňmu, -ň can be used alternatively after the prepositions do, pre, na, za, o, po, do, u (for example pre neho (masc.) = preňho = preň); the special form -eň can be used alternatively (for neuter nouns obligatorily) after the prepositions nad, ponad, cez, pod, popod, pred, popred (for example nad neho (masc.) = nadeň).

=== Demonstrative Pronouns ===
	Singular				Plural	
	Masculine	Masculine Animate	Neuter	Feminine	Masculine Animate	Others
Nominative	ten		to	tá	tí	tie
Accusative	ten	toho	to	tú	tých	tie
Genitive	toho			tej	tých	
Dative	tomu			tej	tým	
Locative	tom			tej	tých	
Instrumental	tým			tou	tými	

like ten (that, the) are declined: tamten (that one), henten (that one), tento (this one), tenže (the same)...

like adjectives are declined: for example istý (certain, same), každý (each), iný (other), taký / onaký (such), všetok (all), sám (-self), onen (that one), and žiaden = žiadny (no one)...

=== Interrogative (and Relative) and Indefinite pronouns ===
who: N: kto - G: koho – D: komu – A: koho – L: kom – I: kým [always masculine animate],
what: N: čo – G: čoho – D: čomu – A: čo – L: čom – I: čím [always neuter];

like kto/čo are declined: nikto (nobody), niekto / dakto (someone), niečo / dačo (something), hocikto (who ever), nič (nothing), ktosi (someone), čosi (something)...

like adjectives are declined: čí (whose), niečí / dačí / hocičí (someone's), ničí (no one's), ktorý (which), aký (what, which), nejaký / dajaký / (some), nijaký / niktorý (no), čísi (someone's), číkoľvek (whose ever). akýsi (some), ktorýsi (some), ktorýkoľvek (which ever)...

=== Possessive pronouns ===
The following are the first person pronouns.

	Singular				Plural	
	Masculine	Masculine Animate	Neuter	Feminine	Masculine Animate	Others
Nominative	môj		moje	moja	moji	moje
Accusative	môj	môjho	moje	moju	mojich	moje
Genitive	môjho			mojej	mojich	mojich
Dative	môjmu			mojej	mojim	
Locative	mojom			mojej	mojich	
Instrumental	mojím			mojou	mojimi	

like môj (my) are declined:

- tvoj (your (sg.)) and svoj (one's own), except that the o never changes in ô (for example tvoj – tvojho...);
- náš (our) and váš (your (plural)), except that the -ô- in môj corresponds to an -á-, and an -o- in môj corresponds to an -a- here (for example náš – G: nášho – L: našom).

not declined are:

- jeho (his), jej (her), ich (their).

== Numerals ==
=== Cardinal Numerals ===
==== Paradigms ====
jeden (one): declined like the adjective pekný;

- Changes for compound numerals in jeden: not declined; see Compound Numerals.

dva (two): N: dvaja (masc. animate); dva (masc. inanimate); dve (otherwise) – G: dvoch – D: dvom – A: dvoch (masc. animate); dva (masc. inanimate); dve (otherwise) – L: dvoch – I: dvoma;

- Changes for compound numerals in dva:

N: dvaja / dva (masc. animate); dva (otherwise),
A: dvoch / dva (masc. animate); dva (otherwise);

- Also declined like dva: obidva / oba (both), and (with the above changes) the second part of the compound numerals 32, 42... 92, if they are declined (see Compound Numerals).

tri (three): N: traja (masc. animate); tri (otherwise) – G: troch – D: trom – A: troch (masc. animate); tri (otherwise) – L: troch – I: troma / tromi.

- Changes for compound numerals in tri, štyri:

N: traja / tri (masc. animate); tri (otherwise),
A: troch / tri (masc. animate); tri (otherwise);
Also declined like tri: štyri (4), and (with the above changes) the second part of the compound numerals 23, 33, 43… 93; 24, 34, 44… 94, if they are declined (see Compound Numerals).

päť (five): N: piati / päť (masc. animate); päť (otherwise) – G: piatich – D: piatim – A: piatich / päť (masc. animate); päť (otherwise) – L: piatich – I: piatimi;

- Also declined like päť: the numerals päť (6) to 19 (19), and 20, 30, 40, 50, 60, 70, 80, 90, and the second part of the compound numerals 25–29, 35–39 ... 95–99, if they are declined (see Compound Numerals).

100, 200, 300... 900; 1000, 2000, 3000... 9000: not declined, but 1000 can be declined like päť.

==== Compound Numerals ====
- if they end in -jeden (for example 21, 101):
  - not declined;
- otherwise:
  - 2 alternatives: not declined or declined; if they are declined, then each number making up the numeral is declined according to its own paradigm (for example 23 chlapov: dvadsiatich troch chlapov).

=== Ordinal Numerals ===
They are declined like adjectives (paradigms pekný and cudzí).

Note: Ordinal numerals are formed by adding adjective endings to the (slightly modified) cardinal numbers, for example:

5: päť – 5th: piaty,
20: dvadsať – 20th: dvadsiaty.
