= Locative case =

Grammatical case indicating a location

In grammar, the locative case (/ˈlɒkətɪv/ LOK-ə-tiv; abbreviated loc) is a grammatical case which indicates a location. In languages using it, the locative case may perform a function which in English would be expressed with such prepositions as "in", "on", "at", and "by". The locative case belongs to the general local cases, together with the lative and ablative case.

The locative case exists in many language groups.

== Indo-European languages ==
The Proto-Indo-European language had a locative case expressing "place where", an adverbial function. The endings are reconstructed as follows:

	Singular	Plural
Athematic	*-i, *-Ø (no ending)	*-su
Thematic	*-e(y), *oy	*-oysu

In most later Indo-European languages, the locative case merged into other cases (often genitive or dative) in form and/or function, but some daughter languages retained it as a distinct case. It is found in:

- modern Balto-Slavic languages, except Bulgarian and Macedonian, although it is mostly used with prepositions in the other Slavic languages
- some classical Indo-European languages, particularly Sanskrit and Old Latin
- (Mostly uncommon, archaic or literary) use in certain modern Indic languages (such as Bangla and Marathi—in which, however, a separate ablative case has disappeared)

=== Latin ===
Old Latin still had a functioning locative singular, which descended from the Proto-Indo-European form. The locative plural was already identical to the dative and ablative plural. In Classical Latin, changes to the Old Latin diphthongs caused the originally-distinctive ending of the locative singular to become indistinguishable from the endings of some other cases.

Declension	Old Latin	Classical Latin	Merger
1st	-āi	-ae	Merged with dative/genitive.
2nd	-ei	-ī	Merged with genitive.
3rd	-ei, -e	-ī, -e	Originally like the dative, but gradually replaced with the ablative.
4th	-ī, -ibus, -ubus		Gradually replaced with the ablative.
5th	-ēd	-ē	Merged with ablative.

Because the locative was already identical to the ablative (which had a "location" meaning as well) in the plural, the loss of distinction between the endings eventually caused the functions of the locative case to be absorbed by the ablative case in Classical Latin. The original locative singular ending, descended from the Old Latin form, remained in use for a few words. For first and second declension, it was identical to the genitive singular form. In archaic times, the locative singular of third declension nouns was still interchangeable between ablative and dative forms, but in the Augustan Period the use of the ablative form became fixed. Therefore, both forms rūrī and rūre may be encountered.

The locative ending of the fifth declension was -ē (singular only), identical to the ablative singular, as in hodiē ('today').

The Latin locative case was only used for the names of cities, "small" islands and a few other isolated words. The Romans considered all Mediterranean islands to be small except for Sicily, Sardinia, Corsica, Crete, and Cyprus. Britannia was also considered to be a "large island". There are a few nouns that use the locative instead of a preposition:

Nominative	Locative	Meaning
rūs	rūrī	In the countryside
domus	domī	At home
humus	humī	On the ground
mīlitia	mīlitiae	In military service/on the field
bellum	bellī	In war
focus	focī	At the hearth
animus	animī	In spirit/at heart/in mind.

bellī and mīlitiae are particularly used in contrast to domī, "at home" to convey that someone is away on military service, and are used interchangeably.

The first declension locative is by far the most common, because so many Roman place names were first declension, such as Roma, Rome, and therefore use the same form as the genitive and dative: Romae, at Rome, and Hiberniae, in Ireland. A few place-names were inherently plural, even though they are a single city, e.g. Athēnae, Athens and Cūmae, Cuma. These plural names also use the form similar to the dative and ablative: Athēnīs, at Athens, and Cūmīs, at Cumae. There are also a number of second declension names that could have locatives, e.g. Brundisium, Brindisi; Eborācum, York; with locatives Brundisiī, at Brindisi; Eborācī, at York. The locative cannot express being located at multiple locations; plural forms only exist because certain proper names such as Athēnae happen to be plural. "He is at home" can be expressed by "(is) domi est" using the locative, but "They are at their (individual and separate) homes" cannot be expressed by the locative.

=== Greek ===
In Ancient Greek, the locative merged with the Proto-Indo-European dative, so that the Greek dative represents the Proto-Indo-European dative, instrumental, and locative. The dative with the preposition ἐν en "in" and the dative of time (e.g., τῇ τρίτῃ ἡμέρᾳ, tēî trítēi hēmérāi, which means "on the third day") are examples of locative datives. Some early texts, in particular Homer, retain the locative in some words (for example ἠῶθεν, ēôthen – at dawn, Iliad 24.401).

=== Germanic languages ===
The locative case had merged with the dative in early Germanic times and was no longer distinct in Proto-Germanic or in any of its descendants. The dative, however, contrasts with the accusative case, which is used to indicate motion toward a place (it has an allative meaning). The difference in meaning between dative and accusative exists in all of the old Germanic languages and survives in all Germanic languages that retain a distinction between the two cases.

=== Sanskrit ===
The locative case in Sanskrit is usually known as the "seventh case" (saptami vibhakti). It is the last out of the main seven cases (vibkhatis) in the language. Along with "in", "on", "at", "or", and "by", the locative case is also generally used with "among" in Sanskrit.

=== Slavic languages ===
Among Slavic languages, the locative is mostly used after a fixed set of commonly used prepositions. Besides location, Slavic languages also employ locative as a way of expressing the method of doing an action, time when the action is to take place, as well as the topic or theme that something describes in more detail; as such it is subordinate to other cases. The locative is kept in all Slavic languages (except for Bulgarian and Macedonian), although Russian split it (in the singular of a group of masculine nouns and in a few 3rd-declension feminines such as дверь) into locative and prepositional, and Serbo-Croatian uses almost the same set of endings (sometimes with different intonation) as for the dative. The ending depends on whether the word is a noun or an adjective (among other factors).

==== Old Slavic ====
In Old Church Slavonic, the locative is mostly used with a preposition. Some uses of independent locatives remain, mostly in expressions of time, such as zimě "in winter", polu nošti "at midnight". The locative also occurs as the complement of a handful of verbs, such as kŭto prikosnǫ sę rizaxŭ moixŭ? "who touched my garments?". In Old East Slavic, moreover, place names are regularly used in the locative without a preposition.

==== Czech ====
The Czech language uses the locative case to denote location (v České republice, 'in the Czech Republic'), but as in the Russian language, the locative case may be used after certain prepositions with meanings other than location (o Praze, 'about Prague', po revoluci, 'after the revolution'). Cases other than the locative may be used to denote location in Czech as well (U Roberta, 'at Robert's house' -genitive, or nad stolem, 'above the table' -instrumental).

The locative case (commonly called the 6th case) is the only one of the 7 Czech cases which cannot be used without a preposition. It is used with these prepositions:

- v (v místnosti = 'in the room', v Praze = 'in Prague'). Using this preposition with the accusative case has a different meaning (v les = 'to the forest') and is regarded as archaic
- na (na stole = 'on the desk', to záleží na tobě = 'it depends on you'). The use of this preposition with the accusative case has a different meaning (na stůl = 'to the desk').
- po (in different meanings: past, after, on, to, for, by). This preposition takes the accusative case in some meanings.
- při (by, nearby, with)
- o (about, of, on, for, at, during, by, with, over, against, using). This preposition with the accusative case has a different use and meaning (jedná se o to ≠ jedná se o tom).

If the preposition uses both accusative and locative case, the accusative is used for direction (where to) while locative for pure location (where). In case of the preposition o (about), this distinction can be very subtle and untranslatable, or depending on the controlling verb.

The locative form of substantives in the singular is mostly identical with the dative case (3rd case). Possible endings for locative case:

- -u (hard masculines: o pánu, hradu, hard neuters: městu)
- -i (soft masculines: o muži, stroji, soudci, some neuters: moři, some feminines: růži, písni, kosti)
- -ovi (animate masculines: o pánovi, mužovi, předsedovi, soudcovi)
- -e (o lese, o Mařce)
- -ě (na hradě, o ženě, o městě)
- -eti (o kuřeti, knížeti)
- -í (o stavení)

For adjectives and adjectival substantives:

- -ém (-ým or -ym in Common Czech) for hard masculine and neuter adjectives (o mladém, vo mladým, o vrátném)
- -m for soft masculine and neuter adjectives (o jarním, o průvodčím)
- -é (-ý or -ej in Common Czech) for hard feminine adjectives (o mladé, vo mladý, vo mladej)
- -í for soft feminine adjectives (o jarní)

The locative form in the plural typically has the ending -ch (o mladých ženách), the dual has ending -ou (v obou dvou případech, na rukou).

See Czech declension for declension patterns for all Czech grammatical cases, including the locative.

==== Slovak ====
The Slovak language uses the locative case to denote location (na Slovensku, 'in Slovakia'), but as in the Russian language, the locative case may be used after certain prepositions with meanings other than location (o Bratislave, 'about Bratislava', po revolúcii, 'after the revolution'). Cases other than the locative may be used to denote location in Slovak as well (U Milana, 'at Milan's house' -genitive, or nad stolom, 'above the table' -instrumental). A preposition must always be used with this case.

There are several different locative endings in Slovak:

- -e Used for singular nouns of all genders (except masculine animate), e.g. stôl → o stole, láska → v láske, mesto → po meste.
- -u Used for:
  - Masculine inanimate singular nouns ending in a velar consonant, e.g. hliník → o hliníku, mozog → v mozgu, bok → na boku, vzduch → vo vzduchu, or a glottal consonant, e.g. hloh → po hlohu
  - All neuter singular nouns ending in -kV, -chV, -iV, -uV (V being o or um), e.g. jablko → v jablku, ucho → na uchu, akvárium → pri akváriu, vákuum → vo vákuu
- -i Used for:
  - Masculine inanimate nouns ending in a soft consonant (c, č, ď, dz, dž, j, ľ, ň, š, ť, ž), e.g. ovládač ("remote") → o ovládači ("about the remote"), tŕň → v tŕni
  - Feminine nouns ending in a soft consonant or a soft consonant followed by a, e.g. vôňa → o vôni, kosť ("bone") → o kosti ("about bone")
  - Feminine nouns ending in -ia or -ea, e.g. Mária → na Márii, Andrea → v Andrei
  - Neuter nouns ending in -e or -ie, e.g. srdce → pri srdci
- -í used for neuter nouns ending in -ie, e.g. vysvedčenie → na vysvedčení
- -ovi used for masculine animate nouns, e.g. chlap → o chlapovi, hrdina → po hrdinovi
- -om used for masculine and neuter singular adjectives: pekný/pekné → o peknom
- -ej used for feminine singular adjectives and feminine nouns ending in -á: pekná gazdiná → na peknej gazdinej
- -m used for masculine animate nouns following the kuli pattern (being most names in -i, -y etc.), e.g. Harry → o Harrym
- -och used for masculine nouns in plural, e.g. malí chlapi → o malých chlapoch
- -ách used for plural feminine and neuter nouns, e.g. ženy ('women') → o ženách ('about women'). There are variations:
  - -ach used when the preceding vowel is long or a diphthong (ia, ie, iu, ô), e.g. lásky → v láskach, dielo → pri dielach
  - -iach used after soft consonants, e.g. schopnosť → o schopnostiach, srdce → v srdciach
- -ích / -ých Used for plural adjectives of all genders, e.g. malé obchody ('small shops') → v malých obchodoch ('in small shops'), with the variation:
  - -ich / -ych when the preceding vowel is long: rýchle autá ('fast cars') → o rýchlych autách ('about fast cars')

See also Slovak declension for declension patterns for all Slovak grammatical cases, including locative.

==== Polish ====
There are several different locative endings in Polish:

- -e is used after hard consonant except for k, g, and (c)h in masculine and neuter nouns. In feminine nouns, it is used after all hard consonant, including k, g, and (c)h. The ending has a softening effect on the preceding consonant.
  - brat → bracie
  - rzeka → rzece
  - noga → nodze
  - rower → rowerze
  - piekło → piekle

For a complete list, see Polish hard and soft consonants.

- -u is used for masculine and neuter nouns after a soft consonant, hardened consonant, k, g, and (c)h.
  - koń → koniu
  - słońce → słońcu
  - dach → dachu
- -y is used in feminine nouns after hardened consonants.
  - ulica → ulicy
  - cisza → ciszy
  - róża → róży
- -i is used in feminine nouns after soft consonants.
  - kawiarnia → kawiarni
  - fasola → fasoli
  - Hania → Hani
- -im / -ym Used for masculine and neuter singular adjectives, e.g. język polski ('Polish language') → w języku polskim ('in the Polish language')
- -ej Used for feminine singular adjectives, e.g. duża krowa ('big cow') → o dużej krowie ('about a big cow')

In plural:

- -ach Used for plural nouns of all genders, e.g. kobiety ('women') → o kobietach ('about women')
- -ich / -ych Used for plural adjectives of all genders, e.g. małe sklepy ('small shops') → w małych sklepach ('in small shops')

==== Russian ====
In the Russian language, the locative case has largely lost its use as an independent case and become the prepositional case, which is used only after a preposition. The latter is not always used to indicate location, while other cases may also be used to specify location (e.g. the genitive case, as in у окна, u okna ("by the window")). Statements such as в библиотеке, v biblioteke ("in the library") or на Аляске, na Aljaske ("in Alaska"), demonstrate the use of the prepositional case to indicate location. However, this case is also used after the preposition "о" ("about") as in о студенте, o studente ("about the student").

Nevertheless, approximately 150 masculine nouns retain a distinct form for the locative case, used only after "в" and "на". These forms end in "-у́" or "-ю́": лежать в снегу́, ležať v snegú (to lie in the snow), but думать о сне́ге, dumať o snége (to think about snow). Other examples are рай, raj (paradise); "в раю́", дым, dym (smoke); and в дыму́, v dymú. As indicated by the accent marks, the stress is always on the last syllable, which is unlike the dative-case forms with the same spelling. A few feminine nouns that end with the soft sign, such as дверь and пыль, also have a locative form that differs from the prepositional in that the stress shifts to the final syllable: на двери́, na dverí ("on the door"), but при две́ри, pri dvéri ("by the door"). These distinct feminine forms are sometimes referenced as "second locative" or "new locative", because they developed independently from the true locative case, which existed in Old Russian.

With some words, such as дом, dom (house), the second locative form is used only in certain idiomatic expressions, while the prepositional is used elsewhere. For example, на дому́, na domu ("at the house" or "at home") would be used to describe activity that is performed at home, while на до́ме ("on the house") would be used to specify the location of the roof.

==== Ukrainian ====
The Ukrainian language uses the locative case to denote locations. For example, "A pen is on a book" would be written as "Ручка на книжці, Ruchka na knyzhtsi" in the locative. Ukrainian locative and instrumental cases usually go with a preposition, unlike the other four cases in Ukrainian grammar, that may generally be employed without prepositions. The most common locative prepositions are на, na, 'on', and в, у, уві, ув, v, u, uvi, uv, 'in'; usage of these four different variations of "in" depends on whether the next word starts with a consonant or vowel.

The locative is used to indicate static spatial relationships and to talk about thoughts, discussions and nuanced ideas. It is distinguished from dynamic spatial relationships, which indicate action or motion, and are expressed in the accusative case in Ukrainian and most other East Slavic languages. The adlative "goal function", which in most East Slavic grammars is prescribed to be expressed in accusative (for example, Ми поклали книжку на стіл, My poklaly knyzhku na stil, 'We laid a book onto the table'), may in Ukrainian sometimes be expressed in locative instead (Ми поклали книжку на столі, My poklaly knyzhku na stoli, 'We laid a book on the table'), but it is only considered acceptable under certain circumstances.

Ukrainian, unlike Russian, still retains a fully functional locative case. However, during the Russification of Soviet Ukraine between the 1930s and the 1980s, several expressions in the Ukrainian language using the locative case, such as "на адресу, na adresu, 'at the address'", were changed by Soviet linguistic policies, in this instance to a genitive case to "за адресою, za adresoyu", in order to conform to standard Russian "за адресом, za adresom". On the other hand, post-Soviet users of Surzhyk may mistakenly be employing the locative Russian form, instead of the instrumental Ukrainian form, in a sentence like "The book is written in English":

- Standard Ukrainian: Книга написана англійською мовою, romanized: Knyha napysana anhlijs'koju movoju, lit. 'book written English language [instrumental case]'
- Surzhyk form: Книга написана на англійській мові, romanized: Knyha napysana na anhlijs'kij movi, 'lit. 'book written on English language [locative case]'
- Standard Russian: Книга написана на английском языке, romanized: Kniga napisana na anglijskom jazyke, lit. 'book written on English language [locative case]'

=== Armenian ===
In the Eastern standard of the Armenian language non-animate nouns take -ում (-um) for the locative. Animate nouns (referring to persons especially) do not take the locative.

համալսարանը → համալսարանում
hamalsaranə {} hamalsaranum
{the university} {} {in/at the university}

ճաշարան → ճաշարանում
chasharan {} chasharanum
{a restaurant} {} {in/at a restaurant}

== Turkic languages ==
The Proto-Turkic language had a locative case, and most Turkic languages have retained it.

=== Turkish ===
The locative case exists in Turkish, as the suffix generally specified by "-DA". For instance, in Turkish, okul means 'the school', and okulda means 'in the school'. The morpheme may exist in four different forms, depending on the preceding consonant and vowel. The first phoneme of the locative, "D", changes according to the previous consonant: it is "t" after voiceless consonants, but "d" elsewhere. The vowel changes depending on the phonetic characteristics of the previous vowel: it is "a" after a preceding back vowel, and "e" after a preceding front vowel, congruent with the vowel harmony of the language. This gives four different versions of the morpheme:

- -ta, as in kitapta, "in the book".
- -te, as in kentte, "in the city".
- -da, as in odada, "in the room".
- -de, as in evde, "in the house".

=== Azerbaijani ===
The locative case also exists in Azerbaijani. Similarly to Turkish, Azerbaijani employs a system of vowel harmony throughout the language. There are two simple Locative case endings:

- -da, as in kitabda, "in the book".
- -də, as in şəhərdə, "in the city".

=== Kazakh ===
The locative case also exists in Kazakh. Similarly to Turkish, Kazakh employs a system of vowel harmony throughout the language. There are four simple locative case endings:

- -та, as in кітапта, kitapta, "in the book".
- -те, as in сөздікте, sözdikte, "in the dictionary".
- -да, as in қалада, qalada, "in the city".
- -де, as in бөлмеде, bölmede, "in the room".

Furthermore, Kazakh nouns frequently utilize a possessive affix to indicate a relationship between the object and its owner. When forming the locative case of a noun in the presence of a possessive affix, there are two possible endings:

- -нда, as in Ерболдың қаласында, Erboldıñ qalasında, "in Erbol's city".
- -нде, as in Ерболдың сөздігінде, Erboldıñ sözdiginde, "in Erbol's dictionary".

=== Uyghur ===
The locative case exists in Uyghur, similarly to Turkish. This gives four different versions of the morpheme:

- -دا -da, as in مەيداندا meydanda, "in the square".
- -دە -de, as in ئۆيدە öyde, "in the house".
- -تا -ta, as in ئاپتاپتا aptapta, "in the sunshine".
- -تە -te, as in دەرستە derste, "in the lesson".

=== Uzbek ===
The locative case exists also in Uzbek. For example, in Uzbek, shahar means 'city', and shaharda means 'in the city', so using -da suffix, the locative case is marked.

== Uralic languages ==
Proto-Uralic has been reconstructed with a single "state" or "stationary" locative case, with the ending *-na or *-nä in accordance with vowel harmony. In many of its descendants, additional locative cases were created by combining these endings with others.

=== Inari Sami ===
In Inari Sami, the locative suffix is -st.

- kielâst, 'in the language'
- kieđast, 'in the hand'

=== Hungarian ===
In the Hungarian language, nine such cases exist, yet the name 'locative case' refers to a form (-t/-tt) used only in a few city/town names along with the inessive case or superessive case. It can also be observed in a few local adverbs and postpositions. It is no longer productive.

Examples:

- Győrött (also Győrben), Pécsett (also Pécsen), Vácott (also Vácon), Kaposvárt and Kaposvárott (also Kaposváron), Vásárhelyt (also Vásárhelyen)
- itt (here), ott (there), imitt, amott (there yonder), alatt (under), fölött (over), között (between/among), mögött (behind) etc.

The town/city name suffixes -ban/-ben are the inessive ones, and the -on/-en/-ön are the superessive ones.

=== Finnic languages ===
In the Finnic languages, the original Proto-Uralic locative became the essive case, but is still found with a locative meaning in some fossilised expressions such as Finnish kotona "at home". Two new locative cases were created from the old locative:

- The inessive case referring to internal location (being inside), with the reconstructed Proto-Finnic ending *-ssa/*-ssä (from earlier *-s-na/*-s-nä).
- The adessive case referring to external location (being on, at), with the reconstructed Proto-Finnic ending *-lla/-llä (from earlier *-l-na/*-l-nä).

These endings still survive as such in several Finnic languages including Finnish, but have been reduced to -s and -l in Estonian and some others.

The Finnic languages, like some Indo-European languages (Latin, Russian, Irish), do not normally use the verb 'to have' to show possession. The adessive case and the verb 'to be' is used instead, so that the combination literally means "on/at me is...". For example, 'I have a house' in Estonian would be Mul on maja in which mul is in the adessive case, on is the third singular of 'to be' (is), and maja is in nominative, not accusative. So maja is the subject, on is the verb and mul is the indirect object. This could be translated to English as 'At me is a house' or 'A house is at me' or 'There is a house at me'.

== Etruscan ==
The Etruscan language has a locative ending in -thi. E.g. velsnalthi, "at Velznani", with reference to Volsinii.

== Algonquian languages ==
Algonquian languages have a locative.

=== Cree ===
In Cree, the locative suffix is -ihk.

- misâskwatômin (Saskatoon berry) → misâskwatôminihk (at the Saskatoon berry) = "[in] Saskatoon, SK"
- misâskwatôminiskâ- (be many Saskatoon berries) → misâskwatôminiskâhk (at the place of many Saskatoon berries) = "[in] Saskatoon, SK"
- mînis (berry) → mînisihk (at the berry) = "[in] Saskatoon, SK"

=== Innu-aimun ===
In Innu-aimun, the locative suffix is -(i)t.

- shipu (river) → shipit (at the river)
- katshishkutamatsheutshuap (school) → katshishkutamatsheutshuapit (at school)
- nuitsheuakan (my friend) → nuitsheuakanit (at my friend's house)
- nipi (water) → nipit (in the water)
- utenau (town) → utenat (in town)

== Bibliography ==
- Buck, Carl Darling (1933). Comparative Grammar of Greek and Latin. Chicago, IL: University of Chicago Press.
- Bilaniuk, L. (2005). Contested Tongues: Language Politics and Cultural Correction in Ukraine. Cornell Paperbacks. Cornell University Press. p. 230. ISBN 978-0-8014-7279-4.
- Nedashkivska, Alla (2001). "Whither or Where: Case Choice and Verbs of Placement in Contemporary Ukrainian". Journal of Slavic Linguistics. 9 (2). Slavica Publishers: 213–251. ISSN 1068-2090. JSTOR 24599580.
