= Abeceda =

Abeceda may refer to:

- Czech orthography (Czech: česká abeceda)
- Slovene alphabet (Slovene: slovenska abeceda)
- Slovak orthography (Slovak: slovenská abeceda)
- Gaj's Latin alphabet
