= ISO/IEC 8859-1 =

Character encoding of Latin script

- ISO/IEC 8859-1 code page layout
- MIME / IANA: ISO-8859-1
- Alias(es): ISO-8859-1, iso-ir-100, csISOLatin1, latin1, l1, IBM819, CP819
- Languages: English, various others
- Standard: ISO/IEC 8859
- Classification: Extended ASCII, ISO/IEC 8859
- Extends: US-ASCII
- Based on: DEC MCS
- Succeeded by: UTF-8; UTF-16
- Other related encodings: ISO/IEC 8859-15; Windows-1252; BraSCII

ISO/IEC 8859-1, commonly referred to as Latin-1, is a character encoding in the ISO/IEC 8859 series of ASCII-based standard character encodings. It encodes 191 characters from the Latin script. It is the basis for many popular 8-bit character sets and the first 256 code points in Unicode.

It is used throughout the Americas, Western Europe, Oceania, and much of Africa, and is the most declared single-byte character encoding for web pages; however, per the HTML5 standard, web browsers interpret it as the superset Windows-1252, so these documents may include characters from that set.

ISO-8859-1 is the Internet Assigned Numbers Authority (IANA) preferred name for this standard when supplemented with the C0 and C1 control codes from ISO/IEC 6429. The following other aliases are registered: iso-ir-100, csISOLatin1, latin1, l1, IBM819, Code page 28591 a.k.a. Windows-28591 is used for it in Windows. IBM calls it code page 819 or CP819 (CCSID 819). Oracle calls it WE8ISO8859P1.

== Coverage ==
The encoding has sufficient coverage for letters of many languages:

=== Modern languages with complete letter coverage ===
- Afrikaans
- Albanian
- Basque
- Breton
- Corsican
- English
- Faroese
- Galician
- Icelandic
- Ido
- Irish
- Indonesian
- Italian
- Leonese
- Lojban
- Luxembourgish (Note: Basic classical orthography)
- Malay (Note: Rumi script)
- Manx
- Norwegian (Note: Bokmål and Nynorsk)
- Occitan
- Portuguese (Note: European and Brazilian)
- Rhaeto-Romanic
- Rotokas
- Scottish Gaelic
- Scots
- Southern Sami
- Spanish
- Swahili
- Swedish
- Tagalog (Latin script)
- Toki Pona
- Walloon

=== Languages with incomplete coverage ===
ISO-8859-1 was commonly used for certain languages, even though it lacks characters used by these languages. In most cases, only a few letters are missing or they are rarely used, and they can be replaced with characters that are in ISO-8859-1 using some form of typographic approximation. The following table lists such languages.

Language	Missing characters	Typical workaround	Supported by
Catalan	Ŀ, ŀ (deprecated)	L·, l·	
Danish	Ǿ, ǿ (the accent is optional and ǿ is very rare)	Ø, ø or øe	
Dutch	Ĳ, ĳ (debatable), j́ (in emphasized words like "blíj́f")	digraphs IJ, ij or ÿ; blíjf	
Estonian, Finnish	Š, š, Ž, ž (only present in loanwords)	Sh, sh, Zh, zh	ISO-8859-15, Windows-1252
French	Œ, œ, and the very rare Ÿ	digraphs OE, oe; Y or Ý	ISO-8859-15, Windows-1252
German	ẞ (capital ß, used only in all capitals)	digraph SS or SZ	
Hungarian	Ő, ő, Ű, ű	Ö, ö, Ü, ü Õ, õ, Û, û (the characters replaced in 8859-2)	ISO-8859-2, Windows-1250
Irish (traditional orthography)	Ḃ, ḃ, Ċ, ċ, Ḋ, ḋ, Ḟ, ḟ, Ġ, ġ, Ṁ, ṁ, Ṗ, ṗ, Ṡ, ṡ, Ṫ, ṫ	Bh, bh, Ch, ch, Dh, dh, Fh, fh, Gh, gh, Mh, mh, Ph, ph, Sh, sh, Th, th	ISO-8859-14
Maltese	Ċ, ċ, Ġ, ġ, Ħ, ħ, Ż, ż	C, c, G, g, H, h, Z, z	ISO-8859-3
Welsh	Ẁ, ẁ, Ẃ, ẃ, Ŵ, ŵ, Ẅ, ẅ, Ỳ, ỳ, Ŷ, ŷ, Ÿ	W, w, Y, y, Ý, ý	ISO-8859-14

The letter ÿ, which appears in French only very rarely, mainly in city names such as L'Haÿ-les-Roses and never at the beginning of words, is included only in lowercase form. The slot corresponding to its uppercase form is occupied by the lowercase letter ß from the German language, which did not have an uppercase form at the time when the standard was created.

=== Missing characters ===
Like all the ISO-8859 encodings and ASCII it lacks symbols which are needed for attractive and correct typography:

- Only « », " ", and ' ' quotation marks are included. "Curly" quotation marks are missing, as are baseline quotation marks and single guillemets used by some of the supported languages. "Curly" apostrophe is also missing.
- The euro sign was first presented to the public on 12 December 1996. Due to this character set being introduced in 1987, it does not include it.
- The en dash and em dash are missing.

Windows-1252 added all of these characters, and ISO/IEC 8859-15 added the euro sign.

== History ==
ISO 8859-1 was based on the Multinational Character Set (MCS) used by Digital Equipment Corporation (DEC) in the popular VT220 terminal in 1983. It was developed within the European Computer Manufacturers Association (ECMA), and published in March 1985 as ECMA-94, by which name it is still sometimes known.

The original draft of ISO 8859-1 placed French Œ and œ at code points 215 (0xD7) and 247 (0xF7), as in the MCS. However, the delegate from France, being neither a linguist nor a typographer, falsely stated that these are not independent French letters on their own, but mere ligatures (like ﬁ or ﬂ), supported by the delegate team from Bull Publishing Company, who regularly did not print French with Œ/œ in their house style at the time. An anglophone delegate from Canada insisted on retaining Œ/œ but was rebuffed by the French delegate and the team from Bull. These code points were soon filled with × and ÷ under the suggestion of the German delegation. Support for French was further reduced when it was again falsely stated that the letter ÿ is "not French", resulting in the absence of the capital Ÿ. In fact, the letter ÿ is found in a number of French proper names, and the capital letter has been used in dictionaries and encyclopedias. These characters were added to ISO/IEC 8859-15:1999. BraSCII matches the original draft.

In 1985, Commodore adopted ECMA-94 for its new AmigaOS operating system. The Seikosha MP-1300AI impact dot-matrix printer, used with the Amiga 1000, included this encoding.

The second edition of ECMA-94 (June 1986) also included ISO 8859-2, ISO 8859-3, and ISO 8859-4 as part of the specification.

The first edition of the ISO standard was published in 1987 (the most recent was published in 1998). Its title is Information technology—8-bit single-byte coded graphic character sets—Part 1: Latin alphabet No. 1.

In 1990, the first version of Unicode used the code points of ISO-8859-1 as the first 256 Unicode code points.

In 1992, the IANA registered the character map ISO_8859-1:1987, more commonly known by its preferred MIME name of ISO-8859-1 (note the extra hyphen over ISO 8859-1), a superset of ISO 8859-1, for use on the Internet. This map assigns the C0 and C1 control codes to the unassigned code values thus provides for 256 characters via every possible 8-bit value.

== Code page layout ==
ISO/IEC 8859-1
	0	1	2	3	4	5	6	7	8	9	A	B	C	D	E	F
0x																
1x																
2x	SP	!	"	#	$	%	&	'	(	)	*	+	,	-	.	/
3x	0	1	2	3	4	5	6	7	8	9	:	;	<	=	>	?
4x	@	A	B	C	D	E	F	G	H	I	J	K	L	M	N	O
5x	P	Q	R	S	T	U	V	W	X	Y	Z	[	\	]		_
6x	`	a	b	c	d	e	f	g	h	i	j	k	l	m	n	o
7x	p	q	r	s	t	u	v	w	x	y	z	{	|	}	~	
8x																
9x																
Ax	NBSP	¡	¢	£	¤	¥	¦	§	¨	©	ª	«	¬	SHY	®	¯
Bx	°	±	²	³	´	µ	¶	·	¸	¹	º	»	¼	½	¾	¿
Cx	À	Á	Â	Ã	Ä	Å	Æ	Ç	È	É	Ê	Ë	Ì	Í	Î	Ï
Dx	Ð	Ñ	Ò	Ó	Ô	Õ	Ö	×	Ø	Ù	Ú	Û	Ü	Ý	Þ	ß
Ex	à	á	â	ã	ä	å	æ	ç	è	é	ê	ë	ì	í	î	ï
Fx	ð	ñ	ò	ó	ô	õ	ö	÷	ø	ù	ú	û	ü	ý	þ	ÿ
Undefined Symbols and punctuation Undefined in the first release of ECMA-94 (1985). In the original draft Œ was at 0xD7 and œ was at 0xF7.

== Web usage ==
ISO-8859-1 was (according to the standard, at least) the default encoding of documents delivered via HTTP with a MIME type beginning with text/, the default encoding of the values of certain descriptive HTTP headers, and defined the repertoire of characters allowed in HTML 3.2 documents. It is specified by many other standards. In practice, the superset encoding Windows-1252 is the more likely effective default and it is increasingly common for UTF-8 to work whether or not a standard specifies it.

As of November 2026, 6.3% of static web pages are served with ISO/IEC 8859-1, and with its superset Windows-1252 used for 8.5% of static pages (and even more used of some subtypes or categories, see below). This contrasts a lot with 0.8% of all web sites using ISO/IEC 8859-1 (explained by the fact most web sites are served programmatically, usually with a mix of static pages). It is the most declared single-byte character encoding, but as Web browsers and the HTML5 standard interpret them as the superset Windows-1252, these documents may include characters from that set. Some countries or languages show a higher usage than the global average, in 2026 Brazil according to website use, use is at 1.4%, and in Germany at 1.8%.

HTML5 is the latest standard that almost all web pages use, but regarding older standards: 13.9% of HTML Transitional web pages use ISO-8859-1 (HTML Transitional is used by 2.7% of all the websites). HTML Strict has 12.9% usage (note though HTML Strict is only used by 0.1% of websites). For the obsolete and little used frameset site element using websites (0.2% of all), 25.0% of those use ISO 8859-1. So it can be said that legacy encodings are more used with older technology, and HTML5 mostly eliminate their use.

== Similar character sets ==
=== ISO/IEC 8859-15 ===
ISO/IEC 8859-15 was developed in 1999, as an update of ISO/IEC 8859-1. It provides some characters for French and Finnish text and the euro sign, which are missing from ISO/IEC 8859-1. This required the removal of some infrequently used characters from ISO/IEC 8859-1, including fraction symbols and letter-free diacritics: ¤, ¦, ¨, ´, ¸, ¼, ½, and ¾. Ironically, three of the newly added characters (Œ, œ, and Ÿ) had already been present in DEC's 1983 Multinational Character Set (MCS), the predecessor to ISO/IEC 8859-1 (1987). Since their original code points were now reused for other purposes, the characters had to be reintroduced under different, less logical code points.

ISO-IR-204, a more minor modification (called code page 61235 by FreeDOS), had been registered in 1998, altering ISO-8859-1 by replacing the universal currency sign (¤) with the euro sign (the same substitution made by ISO-8859-15).

=== Windows-1252 ===
The popular Windows-1252 character set adds all the missing characters provided by ISO/IEC 8859-15, plus a number of typographic symbols, by replacing the rarely used C1 controls in the range 128 to 159 (hex 80 to 9F). It is very common for Windows-1252 text to be mislabelled as ISO-8859-1. A common result was that all the quotes and apostrophes (produced by "smart quotes" in word-processing software) were replaced with question marks or boxes on non-Windows operating systems, making text difficult to read. Many Web browsers and e-mail clients will interpret ISO-8859-1 control codes as Windows-1252 characters, and that behavior was later standardized in HTML5.

=== Mac Roman ===
The Apple Macintosh computer introduced a character encoding called Mac Roman in 1984. It was meant to be suitable for Western European desktop publishing. It is a superset of ASCII, and has most of the characters that are in ISO-8859-1 and all the extra characters from Windows-1252, but in a totally different arrangement. The few printable characters that are in ISO/IEC 8859-1, but not in this set, are often a source of trouble when editing text on Web sites using older Macintosh browsers, including the last version of Internet Explorer for Mac.

=== Other ===
DOS has code page 850, which has all printable characters that ISO-8859-1 has, albeit in a totally different arrangement, plus the most widely used graphic characters from code page 437.

Between 1989 and 2015, Hewlett-Packard used another superset of ISO-8859-1 on many of their calculators. This proprietary character set was sometimes referred to simply as "ECMA-94" as well. HP also has code page 1053, which adds the medium shade (▒, U+2592) at 0x7F.

Several EBCDIC code pages were purposely designed to have the same set of characters as ISO-8859-1, to allow easy conversion between them.

== See also ==
- Latin script in Unicode
- Unicode
- Universal Coded Character Set
  - European Unicode subset (DIN 91379)
- UTF-8
- Windows code pages
- ISO/IEC JTC 1/SC 2
