= Slovak orthography =

Orthography of the Slovak language

Slovak alphabet Slovenská abeceda
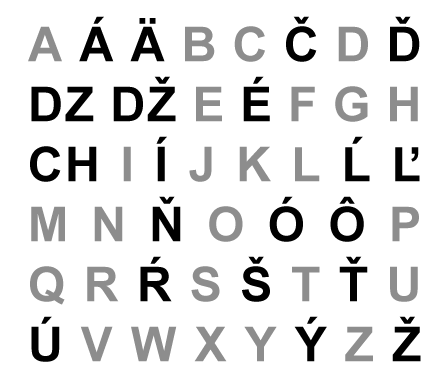
- Script type: Alphabet
- Period: 18th century – present
- Official script: Slovakia
- Languages: Slovak

Related scripts
- Parent systems: Egyptian hieroglyphs: Proto-Sinaitic alphabet; Phoenician alphabet; Greek alphabet; Old Italic scripts; Latin alphabet; Czech alphabet; Slovak alphabet

Unicode
- Unicode range: Subset of Latin

The first Slovak orthography was proposed and created by the Slovak Catholic priest Anton Bernolák (1762–1813) in his Dissertatio philologico-critica de litteris Slavorum, used in the six-volume Slovak-Czech-Latin-German-Hungarian Dictionary (1825–1927) and used primarily by Slovak Catholics.

The standard orthography of the Slovak language is immediately based on the standard developed by Ľudovít Štúr in 1844 and reformed by Martin Hattala in 1852 with the agreement of Štúr. The then-current (1840s) form of the central Slovak dialect was chosen as the standard. After Hattala's reform, the standardized orthography remained mostly unchanged.

== Alphabet ==
The current Slovak alphabet is based on the Latin alphabet with 46 letters including four diacritics (ˇ; mäkčeň, ´; acute accent, ¨; diaeresis/umlaut, ˆ; circumflex), which makes it the longest Slavic and European alphabet.

Majuscule forms (also called uppercase or capital letters)
A	Á	Ä	B	C	Č	D	Ď	Dz	Dž	E	É	F	G	H	Ch	I	Í	J	K	L	Ĺ	Ľ
M	N	Ň	O	Ó	Ô	P	Q	R	Ŕ	S	Š	T	Ť	U	Ú	V	W	X	Y	Ý	Z	Ž
Minuscule forms (also called lowercase or small letters)
a	á	ä	b	c	č	d	ď	dz	dž	e	é	f	g	h	ch	i	í	j	k	l	ĺ	ľ
m	n	ň	o	ó	ô	p	q	r	ŕ	s	š	t	ť	u	ú	v	w	x	y	ý	z	ž

Letter	Letter name	Pronunciation	Usual phonetic values	Morse code
A a	á	[aː]	[a]	▄ ▄▄▄
Á á	dlhé á	[ˈdl̩ɦeː ˈaː]	[aː]	▄ ▄▄▄ ▄▄▄ ▄ ▄▄▄
Ä ä	prehlasované á; a s dvoma bodkami; široké e	[ˈpreɦlasɔʋaneː ˈaː]; [ˈa z ˈdʋɔma ˈbɔtkami]; [ˈʂirɔkeː ˈe]	[ɛɐ], [e]	▄ ▄▄▄ ▄ ▄▄▄
B b	bé	[beː]	[b], [p]	▄▄▄ ▄ ▄ ▄
C c	cé	[tseː]	[ts], [dz]	▄▄▄ ▄ ▄▄▄ ▄
Č č	čé	[tʂeː]	[tʂ], [dʐ]	▄▄▄ ▄ ▄▄▄ ▄ ▄
D d	dé	[deː]	[d], [t], [ɟ]	▄▄▄ ▄ ▄
Ď ď	ďé; mäkké dé	[ɟeː]; [ˈmɛɐkkeː ˈdeː]	[ɟ], [c]	▄ ▄ ▄ ▄ ▄ ▄ ▄ ▄
Dz dz	dzé	[dzeː]	[dz], [ts]	▄ ▄ ▄ ▄ ▄ ▄ ▄ ▄
Dž dž	džé	[dʐeː]	[dʐ], [tʂ]	▄▄▄ ▄ ▄ ▄ ▄▄▄
E e	é	[eː]	[e]	▄
É é	dlhé é	[ˈdl̩ɦeː ˈeː]	[eː]	▄ ▄ ▄▄▄ ▄ ▄
F f	ef	[ef]	[f], [v]	▄ ▄ ▄▄▄ ▄
G g	gé	[ɡeː]	[ɡ], [k]	▄▄▄ ▄▄▄ ▄
H h	há	[ɦaː]	[ɦ], [x], [ɣ]	▄ ▄ ▄ ▄
Ch ch	chá	[xaː]	[x], [ɣ]	▄▄▄ ▄▄▄ ▄▄▄ ▄▄▄
I i	í	[iː]	[i]	▄ ▄
Í í	dlhé í	[ˈdl̩ɦeː ˈiː]	[iː]	▄ ▄ ▄ ▄ ▄ ▄ ▄ ▄
J j	jé	[jeː]	[j]	▄ ▄▄▄ ▄▄▄ ▄▄▄
K k	ká	[kaː]	[k], [ɡ]	▄▄▄ ▄ ▄▄▄
L l	el	[el]	[l], [l̩]	▄ ▄▄▄ ▄ ▄
Ĺ ĺ	dlhé el	[ˈdl̩ɦeː ˈel]	[l̩ː]	▄ ▄ ▄▄▄ ▄▄▄ ▄ ▄▄▄
Ľ ľ	eľ; mäkké el	[eʎ]; [ˈmɛɐkkeː ˈel]	[ʎ]	▄ ▄ ▄ ▄ ▄ ▄ ▄ ▄
M m	em	[em]	[m], [ɱ]	▄▄▄ ▄▄▄
N n	en	[en]	[n]	▄▄▄ ▄
Ň ň	eň	[eɲ]	[ɲ]	▄▄▄ ▄▄▄ ▄ ▄▄▄ ▄▄▄
O o	o	[ɔ]	[ɔ]	▄▄▄ ▄▄▄ ▄▄▄
Ó ó	ó; dlhé o	[ɔː]; [ˈdl̩ɦeː ˈɔ]	[ɔː]	▄▄▄ ▄▄▄ ▄▄▄ ▄
Ô ô	ô	[ʊɔ]	[ʊɔ]	▄ ▄ ▄ ▄ ▄ ▄ ▄ ▄
P p	pé	[peː]	[p], [b]	▄ ▄▄▄ ▄▄▄ ▄
Q q	kvé	[kʋeː]	[kʋ]	▄▄▄ ▄▄▄ ▄ ▄▄▄ / Occurs only in loanwords.
R r	er	[er]	[r], [r̩]	▄ ▄▄▄ ▄
Ŕ ŕ	dlhé er	[ˈdl̩ɦeː ˈer]	[r̩ː]	▄ ▄▄▄ ▄ ▄ ▄▄▄ ▄
S s	es	[es]	[s], [z]	▄ ▄ ▄
Š š	eš	[eʂ]	[ʂ], [ʐ]	▄▄▄ ▄▄▄ ▄▄▄ ▄▄▄
T t	té	[teː]	[t], [d], [c]	▄▄▄
Ť ť	ťé; mäkké té	[ceː]; [ˈmɛɐkkeː ˈteː]	[c], [ɟ]	▄▄▄ ▄▄▄ ▄▄▄ ▄▄▄
U u	u	[u]	[u], [w]	▄ ▄ ▄▄▄
Ú ú	dlhé ú	[ˈdl̩ɦeː ˈuː]	[uː]	▄▄▄ ▄▄▄ ▄▄▄ ▄ ▄ ▄▄▄
V v	vé	[ʋeː]	[ʋ], [w], [v], [f]	▄ ▄ ▄ ▄▄▄
W w	dvojité vé	[ˈdʋɔjiteː ˈʋeː]	[ʋ], [w], [v], [f]	▄ ▄▄▄ ▄▄▄ / Occurs only in loanwords.
X x	iks	[iks]	[ks]	▄▄▄ ▄ ▄ ▄▄▄ / Occurs only in loanwords.
Y y	ypsilon	[ˈipsilɔn]	[i]	▄▄▄ ▄ ▄▄▄ ▄▄▄
Ý ý	dlhý ypsilon	[ˈdl̩ɦiː ˈipsilɔn]	[iː]	▄▄▄ ▄ ▄ ▄ ▄ ▄▄▄
Z z	zet	[zet]	[z], [s]	▄▄▄ ▄▄▄ ▄ ▄
Ž ž	žet	[ʐet]	[ʐ], [ʂ]	▄▄▄ ▄▄▄ ▄ ▄ ▄▄▄

In IPA transcriptions of Slovak, [tʂ, dʐ, ʂ, ʐ] are often written with ⟨tʃ, dʒ, ʃ, ʒ⟩, i.e. as if they were palato-alveolar. The palato-alveolar [tʃ, dʒ, ʃ, ʒ] exist in Slovak, but only as allophones of /tʂ, dʐ, ʂ, ʐ/, which are normally retroflex, as in Polish.

The following digraphs are not considered to be a part of the Slovak alphabet:

- ⟨ia⟩, which stands for the rising-opening diphthong [ɪɐ], similar to the /jæ/ sequence in English (as in yap /jæp/), rather than the common [ɪɐ] realization of the underlying /ɪr/ in the German word Wirt [vɪɐt] 'host', which is falling;
- ⟨ie⟩, which stands for the rising-opening diphthong [ɪe], similar to the /jɛ/ sequence in English (as in yes /jɛs/);
- ⟨iu⟩, which stands for the rising-backing diphthong [ɪu], similar to the /juː/ sequence in English (as in use /juːz/) (but with a short ending point), never as a falling-backing diphthong as in some Welsh English new [nɪu].

In loanwords, all three can stand for the disyllabic sequences [i.a, i.e, i.u], rather than the rising diphthongs. The starting points of those diphthongs are written with ⟨ɪ⟩, rather than ⟨j⟩ (as in Spanish tierra [ˈtjera]) because [ɪɐ, ɪe, ɪu] count as a long vowel in the rhythmical rule described below, unlike the phonological consonant /j/ followed by a short vowel. [ʊɔ] also counts as a long vowel, though there is no *[wɔ] sequence to rival it, as [w] never appears before a vowel within the same word.

== Sound–spelling correspondences ==
The primary principle of Slovak spelling is the phonemic principle. The secondary principle is the morphological principle: forms derived from the same stem are written in the same way even if they are pronounced differently. An example of this principle is the assimilation rule (see below). The tertiary principle is the etymological principle, which can be seen in the use of i after certain consonants and of y after other consonants, although both i and y are pronounced the same way.

Finally, the rarely applied grammatical principle is present when, for example, the basic singular form and plural form of masculine adjectives are written differently with no difference in pronunciation (e.g. pekný = nice – singular versus pekní = nice – plural).

Most foreign words receive Slovak spelling immediately or after some time. For example, "weekend" is spelled víkend [ˈʋiːkent], "software" - softvér [ˈsɔftʋeːr], "gay" - gej [ɡej] (both not exclusively), and "quality" is spelled kvalita. Personal and geographical names from other languages using Latin alphabets keep their original spelling unless a fully Slovak form of the name exists (e.g. Londýn [ˈlɔndiːn] for "London").

The letters e, i, í, ie, ia trigger the palatal realization of the preceding D, N, T, L with few exceptions when the letters denote the ordinary alveolar phonetic value. To accelerate writing, a rule has been introduced that the frequent sequences [ɟe], [ce], [ɲe], [ʎe], [ɟi], [ci], [ɲi], [ʎi], [ɟiː], [ciː], [ɲiː], [ʎiː], [ɟɪe], [cɪe], [ɲɪe], [ʎɪe] [ɟɪɐ], [cɪɐ], [ɲɪɐ], [ʎɪɐ] are written without a mäkčeň as de, te, ne, le, di, ti, ni, li, dí, tí, ní, lí, die, tie, nie, lie, dia, tia, nia, lia.

Some exceptions are as follows:

1. foreign words (e.g. telefón is pronounced [ˈtelefɔːn])
2. the following words: ten [ten] 'that', jeden [ˈjeden] 'one', vtedy [ˈftedi] 'then', teraz [ˈteras] 'now'
3. nominative masculine plural endings of pronouns and adjectives do not turn the preceding d, n, t into palatal consonants (e.g. tí odvážni mladí muži [tiː ˈɔdvaːʐni ˈmladiː ˈmuʐi], the/those brave young men)
4. in adjectival endings, both the long é and the short e (shortened by the rhythmical rule) do not make the preceding d, n, t palatal, so that both zelené stromy [ˈzeleneː ˈstrɔmi] 'green trees' and krásne stromy [ˈkraːsne ˈstrɔmi] 'beautiful trees' feature the alveolar [n], rather than the alveolo-palatal [ɲ].
5. However, the adverb krásne [ˈkraːsɲe] (meaning 'beautifully') does feature the alveolo-palatal [ɲ], resulting in a heterophonic homograph with krásne [ˈkraːsne] 'beautiful' (inflected), which features the same alveolar [n] as the uninflected form krásny [ˈkraːsni], which has an unambiguous spelling. There are some more examples of heterophonic homographs like this.

When a voiced obstruent (b, d, ď, dz, dž, g, h, z, ž) is at the end of the word before a pause, it is pronounced as its voiceless counterpart (p, t, ť, c, č, k, ch, s, š, respectively). For example, pohyb is pronounced [ˈpɔɦip] and prípad is pronounced [ˈpriːpat].

When "v" is at the end of the syllable, it is pronounced as labio-velar [w]. For example, kov [kɔw] (metal), kravský [ˈkrawskiː] (cow - adjective), but povstať [ˈpɔfstac] (uprise), because the /v/ is morpheme-initial (po-vstať).

The feminine singular instrumental suffix -ou is also pronounced [ɔw], as if it were spelled -ov.

Consonant clusters containing both voiced and voiceless elements are entirely voiced if the last consonant is voiced, or entirely voiceless if the last consonant is voiceless. For example, otázka is pronounced [ˈɔtaːska] and vzchopiť sa is pronounced [ˈfsxɔpic sa]. This rule applies also over the word boundary. One example is as follows: prísť domov [ˈpriːzɟ ˈdɔmɔw] (to come home) and viac jahôd [ˈʋɪɐdz ˈjaɦʊɔt] (more strawberries). The voiced counterpart of "ch" /x/ is [ɣ], and the unvoiced counterpart of "h" /ɦ/ is [x].

One of the most important changes in Slovak orthography in the 20th century was in 1953 when s began to be written as z where pronounced [z] in prefixes (e.g. smluva into zmluva [ˈzmluʋa] as well as sväz into zväz [zʋɛɐs]). The phonemic principle has been given priority over the etymological principle in this case.

=== Rhythmical rule ===
The rhythmical rule, also known as the rule of "rhythmical shortening", states that a long syllable (that is, a syllable containing á, é, í, ý, ó, ú, ŕ, ĺ, ia, ie, iu, ô) cannot be followed by another long one within the same word. If two long syllables were to occur next to each other, the second one is to be made short. This rule has morphophonemic implications for declension (e.g. žen-ám [ˈʐenaːm] but tráv-am [ˈtraːʋam]) and conjugation (e.g. nos-ím [ˈnɔsiːm] but súd-im). Several exceptions of this rule exist. It is typical of literary Slovak, and does not appear in Czech or in some Slovak dialects.

== Diacritics ==
The acute mark (in Slovak "dĺžeň", "prolongation mark" or "lengthener") indicates length (e.g. í = [iː]). This mark may appear on any vowel except "ä" (wide "e", široké "e" in Slovak). It may also appear above the consonants "l" and "r", indicating the long syllabic [l̩ː] and [r̩ː] sounds.

The circumflex ("vokáň") exists only above the letter "o". It turns the o into a diphthong (see above).

The umlaut ("prehláska", "dve bodky" = two dots) is only used above the letter "a". It indicates an opening diphthong [ɛɐ], similar to German Herz [hɛɐts] 'heart' (when it is not pronounced [hɛʁts], with a consonantal /r/).

The caron (in Slovak "mäkčeň", "palatalization mark" or "softener") indicates a change of alveolar fricatives, affricates, and plosives into either retroflex or palatal consonants, in informal Slovak linguistics often called just "palatalization". Eight consonants can bear a mäkčeň. Not all "normal" consonants have a counterpart with mäkčeň:

- In printed texts, the mäkčeň is printed in two forms: (1) č, dž, š, ž, ň and (2) ľ, ď, ť (looking more like an apostrophe), but this is just a convention. In handwritten texts, it usually always appears in the first form.
- Phonetically, two forms of "palatalization" exist: ľ, ň, ď, ť are palatal, while č, dž, š, ž are retroflex (which, phonetically speaking, is not "soft" but "hard").

== Computer encoding ==
The Slovak alphabet is historical available within the ISO/IEC 8859-2 "Latin-2" encoding, which generally supports Eastern European languages. All vowels, but none of the specific consonants (that is, no č, ď, ľ, ĺ, ň, ŕ, š, ť, ž) are available within the "Latin-1" encoding, which generally supports only Western European languages.

Today is practical preferring Unicode (practical UTF-8) and often with environment of the operations system Windows both Windows-1250.

== See also ==
- Slovak phonology
- Czech orthography
- Slovene alphabet
- Orthographia bohemica
