= Ď =

Latin letter D with caron

D with caron in Doulos SIL

The grapheme Ď (minuscule: ď) is a Latin letter used in the Czech and Slovak alphabets used to denote /ɟ/, the voiced palatal plosive (precisely alveolo-palatal), a sound similar to British English d in dew. It was also used in Polabian and Belanda Bor language of South Sudan. The majuscule of the letter (Ď) is formed from Latin D with the addition of a háček; the minuscule of the letter (ď) has a háček modified to an apostrophe-like stroke instead of a wedge. When collating, Ď is placed right after regular D in the alphabet.

Ď is also used to represent uppercase eth in the coat of arms of Shetland although the standard uppercase form of eth is Ð.

== Encoding ==
Character information
Preview	Ď		ď	
Unicode name	LATIN CAPITAL LETTER D WITH CARON		LATIN SMALL LETTER D WITH CARON	
Encodings	decimal	hex	dec	hex
Unicode	270	U+010E	271	U+010F
UTF-8	196 142	C4 8E	196 143	C4 8F
Numeric character reference	&#270;	&#x10E;	&#271;	&#x10F;
Named character reference	&Dcaron;		&dcaron;	

In Unicode, the letters are encoded at U+010E Ď LATIN CAPITAL LETTER D WITH CARON (&Dcaron;) and U+010F ď LATIN SMALL LETTER D WITH CARON (&dcaron;).

As recorded by the Unicode Consortium, the form of the minuscule letter preferred for typesetting is "d with a curved apostrophe" (rather than "d with a caron diacritic").

== See also ==
- Czech orthography
- Czech phonology
- Slovak phonology
- Slovak orthography
