= Ť =

Latin letter T with caron

Latin T with caron

The grapheme Ť (minuscule: ť) is a letter in the Czech and Slovak alphabets used to denote /c/, the voiceless palatal plosive (precisely alveolo-palatal), the sound similar to British English t in stew. It is formed from Latin T with the addition of háček; minuscule (ť) has háček modified to apostrophe-like stroke instead of wedge. In the alphabet, Ť is placed right after regular T.

== Encoding ==
Character information
Preview	Ť		ť	
Unicode name	LATIN CAPITAL LETTER T WITH CARON		LATIN SMALL LETTER T WITH CARON	
Encodings	decimal	hex	dec	hex
Unicode	356	U+0164	357	U+0165
UTF-8	197 164	C5 A4	197 165	C5 A5
Numeric character reference	&#356;	&#x164;	&#357;	&#x165;
Named character reference	&Tcaron;		&tcaron;	

In Unicode, the letters are encoded at U+0164 Ť LATIN CAPITAL LETTER T WITH CARON (&Tcaron;) and U+0165 ť LATIN SMALL LETTER T WITH CARON (&tcaron;).

== See also ==
- Czech orthography
- Czech phonology
- Slovak phonology
- Slovak orthography
