= Ö =

Latin letter O with two dots

O with diaeresis
- Ö ö

Usage
- Writing system: Latin script
- Type: alphabetic
- Language of origin: German
- Sound values: [œ]; [ɔ̃]; [ø]
- In Unicode: U+00D6, U+00F6

History
- Development: OE oe: Œ œ; Oͤ oͤ; Ö ö
- Transliterations: oe

Other
- Associated numbers: ASCII-8 / ALT Code(s): 246 (ö), 214 (Ö)
- Writing direction: Left to right

Ö (minuscule: ö) is a character that represents either a letter from several extended Latin alphabets, or the letter "o" modified with an umlaut or diaeresis. Ö, or ö, is a variant of the letter O. In many languages, the letter "ö", or the "o" modified with an umlaut, is used to denote the close- or open-mid front rounded vowels [ø] or [œ]; compare the vowel in "girl", which in these languages phonetically could be written: /görl/. In languages without such vowels, the character is known as an "o with diaeresis" and denotes a syllable break, wherein its pronunciation remains an unmodified [o].

== O-umlaut ==
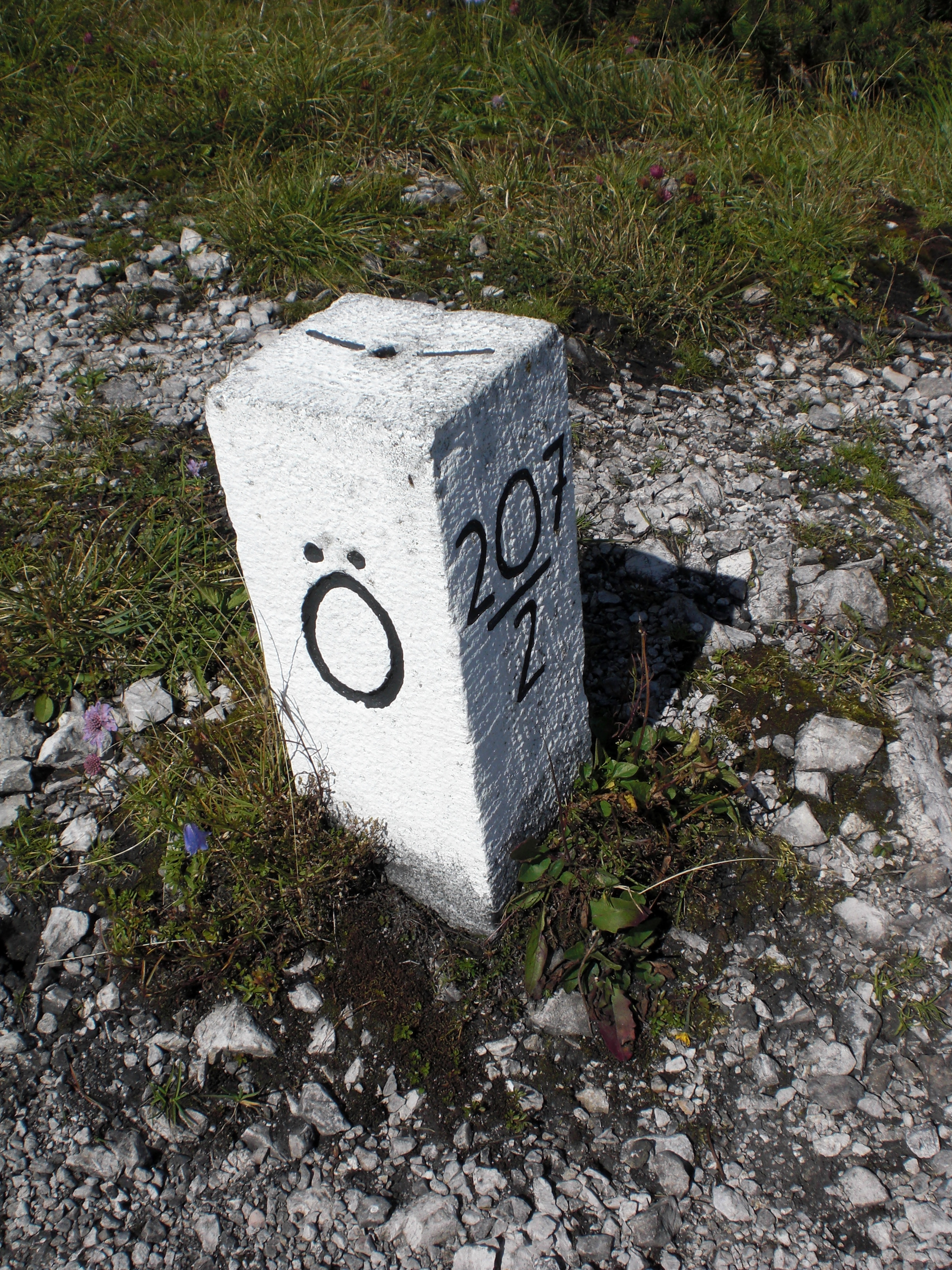
The letter Ö, standing for Österreich, i.e. Austria, on a boundary stone at the German-Austrian border

The letter o with umlaut (ö) appears in the German alphabet. It represents the umlauted form of o, resulting in [œ] or [ø]. The letter is often collated together with o in the German alphabet, but there are exceptions which collate it like oe or OE. The letter also occurs in some languages that have adopted German names or spellings, but it is not normally a part of those alphabets. In Danish and Norwegian, ö was previously used in place of ø in older texts to distinguish between open and closed ö-sounds. It is also used when confusion with other symbols could occur, on maps for instance. The Danish/Norwegian ø is, like the German/Swedish ö, a development of oe and can be compared with the French œ. In other languages that do not have the letter as part of the regular alphabet or in limited character sets such as ASCII, o-umlaut is frequently replaced with the digraph oe. For example, German hören (hear/listen) can be easily recognized even if spelled hoeren.

== Ö in other languages ==
The letter ö also occurs in two other Germanic languages: Swedish and Icelandic, but it is regarded there as a separate letter, not as an orthographic variation of the letter o. Apart from Germanic languages, it occurs in the Uralic languages such as Finnish, Karelian, Veps, Estonian, Southern Sami, and Hungarian, in the Turkic languages such as Azeri, Turkish, Turkmen, Uyghur (Latin script), Crimean Tatar, Kazakh, and in the Uto-Aztecan language Hopi, where it represents the vowel sounds [ø, œ]. Its name in Finnish, Swedish, Icelandic, Estonian, Azeri, Turkish, Turkmen, Uyghur, Crimean Tatar, Hungarian, Votic and Volapük is Öö [øː], not "O with two dots" since /ø/ is not a variant of the vowel /o/ but a distinct phoneme.

In mountain dialects of Emilian, it is used to represent [ø], e.g. tött [tøtː] "all".

In the Dutch language, ⟨ö⟩ appears only as O-diaeresis - see below. The sound /øː/ is spelled with the digraph ⟨eu⟩, as in deur /døːr/ 'door'. In the Dutch-based orthographies of Low Saxon, Limburgish and Ripuarian, ⟨ö⟩ is used only for the short /œ/ (as in Maastrichtian bös /bœs/ 'bus'), whereas the long /œː/ (lowered to /ɶː/ in Maastricht) and /øː/ are typically written unambiguously with ⟨äö⟩ (since it is often an umlauted form of ⟨ao⟩, /ɔː/ in IPA) and ⟨eu⟩, the latter following the Standard Dutch spelling. The example words (in Maastrichtian) are väöl /vɶːl/ 'a lot' and beuk /bøːk/ 'beech'. The short close-mid /ø/ (which instead can be transcribed in IPA with ⟨ʏ⟩) tends to be spelled with ⟨u⟩ (as in Maastrichtian stum /støm/ 'voice'), but this can also be used for /y(ː)/ in open syllables, again following the Standard Dutch spelling. On the German side of the border, ⟨ö⟩ can be used for any of the /œ, œː, ø, øː/ (thus Bös(s), vö(h)l, Stömm, Bö(h)k), whereas /y(ː)/ is always written distinctly, as ⟨ü(h)⟩. ⟨u⟩ is never used for any of the aforementioned front vowels; instead, it denotes the close back rounded vowel /u(ː)/, as in Standard German. The length is usually disambiguated by doubling the following consonant (which denotes the short /œ, ø/), not doubling it or adding a silent ⟨h⟩ after ⟨ö⟩ (both denoting the long /œː, øː/). The exact height normally remains ambiguous, but the open-mid /œ(ː)/ can be disambiguated by adding a grave accent above ⟨ö⟩, as in ⟨ö̀⟩ (thus bö̀ss, vö̀(h)l), similarly to some Swiss German orthographies. This is not the usual practice, not least because the diacritics end up stacked on top of one another.

In certain languages, the letter ö cannot be written as "oe" because minimal pairs exist between ö and oe (and also with oo, öö and öe), as in Finnish eläinkö "animal?" (interrogative) vs. eläinkoe "animal test" (cf. Germanic umlaut). If the character ö is unavailable, o is substituted and context is relied upon for inference of the intended meaning. In Volapük, ö can be written as oy, but never as oe. In the aforementioned Dutch-based orthographies of Low Saxon, Limburgish and Ripuarian, ⟨ö⟩ also cannot be written with ⟨oe⟩ because the latter denotes the close back /u(ː)/, as in Standard Dutch. Thus, Maastrichtian bös /bœs/ 'bus' cannot be spelled *boes because it is not pronounced */buːs/ (cf. moes /muːs˦/ 'mouse'). The German-based orthographies, in which /u(ː)/ is always spelled ⟨u(h)⟩, have no such limitation. In those, ⟨oe⟩ is read as identical with ⟨ö⟩, same as in Standard German.

In Romagnol, ö is used to represent [ɔə~ɔː], e.g. cöt [kɔət~kɔːt] "cooked".

In the Seneca language, ö is used to represent [ɔ̃], a back mid rounded nasalized vowel.

In Swedish, the letter ö is also used as the one-letter word for an island, which is not to be mixed with the actual letter. Ö in this sense is also a Swedish-language surname.

In the Seri language, ö indicates the labialization of the previous consonant, e.g. cöihiin /kʷiˈʔiin/ "sanderling".

=== Alphabetical position ===
In some alphabets it is collated as an independent letter, sometimes by placing it at or near the end of the alphabet, such as after Z, Å and Ä in Swedish and Finnish, after Ý, (Z), Þ and Æ in Icelandic, and after V, (W), Õ and Ä in Estonian (thus fulfilling the place of omega, for example in the Finnish expression aasta ööhön "from A to Z", literally "from A to Ö"). However, in Hungarian, and in the Turkish alphabet and other Turkic alphabets that have ö, it is an independent letter between o and p.

== O-diaeresis ==
O with diaeresis occurs in several languages that use diaereses. In these languages the letter represents the fact that this o is the start of a new syllable (e.g. in the Dutch/Afrikaans word coöperatief [cooperative]), instead of the general oo (e.g. In the Dutch word doorn [thorn]) .

=== In English ===
Some writers and publications, such as The New Yorker, use it in English words such as zoölogy and coöperate to indicate that the second vowel is pronounced separately. It is also employed in names such as Laocoön, Coös County, and the constellation Boötes. This is also done in Dutch.

== Usage in phonetic alphabets ==
The letter Ö

In the Rheinische Dokumenta, a phonetic alphabet for many West Central German, the Low Rhenish, and few related vernacular languages, ö represents the close-mid front rounded vowel with the IPA notation [ø]. The open-mid front rounded vowel [œ] is transcribed as ⟨ö⟩ with an ogonek below, thus ⟨ǫ̈⟩.

The Uralic phonetic alphabet uses ⟨Ö⟩ as in Finnish to denote the front vowel [ø].

== Typography ==
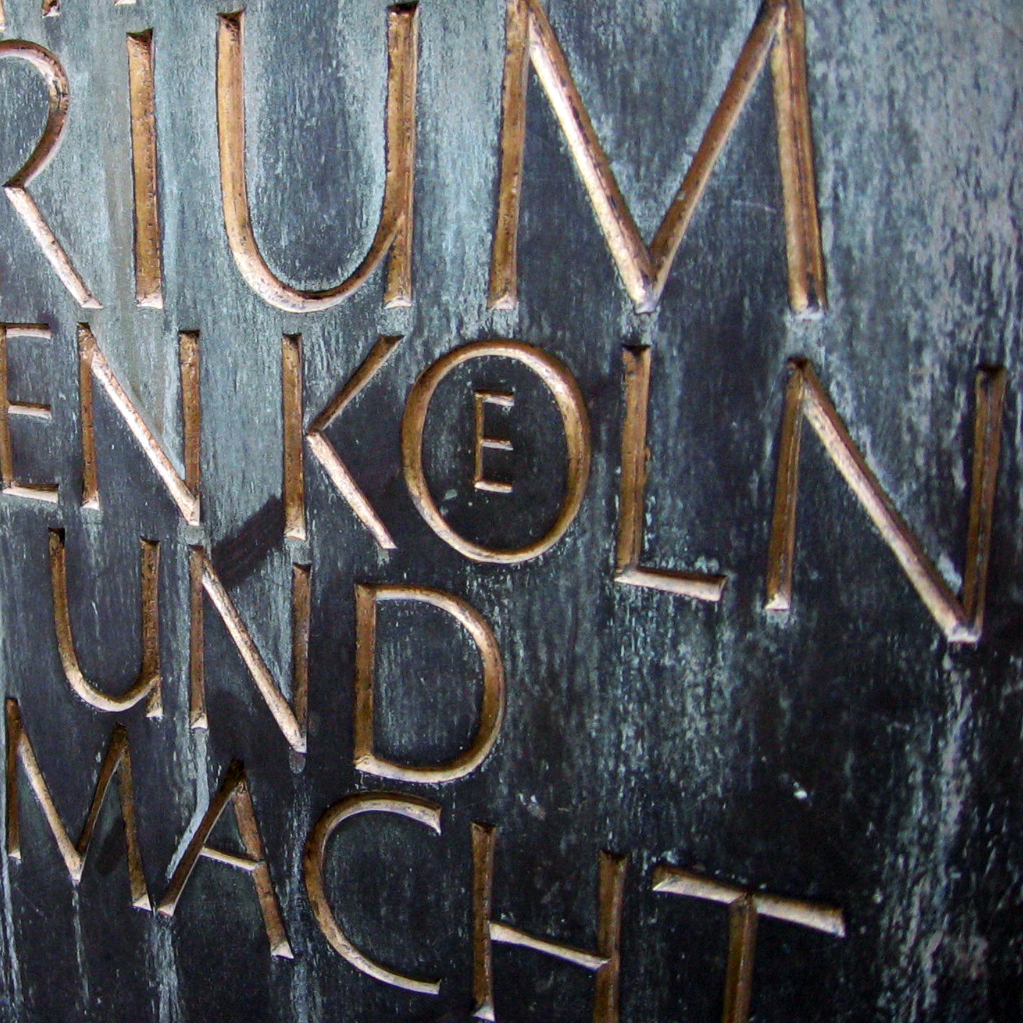
Unusual form of the Œ or Ö ligature, with a small E inside the O. From an inscription in the crypt of Cologne (Köln) Cathedral.

Historically O-diaeresis was written as an o with two dots above the letter. O-umlaut was written as an o with a small e written above in cursive old German (Gothic) script (Oͤ oͤ): this tiny e is represented by two vertical bars connected by a slanted line, which then degenerated to two vertical bars in early modern handwritings. In most later handwriting, these bars in turn nearly became dots. The origin of the letter ö was a similar ligature for the digraph OE: e was written above o and degenerated into two small dots.

In some inscriptions and display typefaces, ö may be seen represented as an o with a small letter e inside.

In modern typography there was insufficient space on typewriters and later computer keyboards to allow for both an O-with-dots (also representing ö) and an o-with-bars. Since they looked nearly identical, the two glyphs were combined, which was also done in computer character encodings such as ISO 8859-1. As a result, there was no way to differentiate between the different characters.

Other alphabets containing o-diaeresis include the Welsh alphabet.

Other alphabets containing o-umlaut include: the Turkmen alphabet (for the vowel [ø]), the Azerbaijani alphabet (for the vowel [œ]), the Yapese alphabet (for [œ]), the Luxembourgish alphabet (when writing loanwords from Standard German), the Slovenian alphabet (when writing loanwords from German, Hungarian and Turkish), and the Dinka alphabet. The Hungarian alphabet contains both ö and ő: double acute o is the longer pair of ö. See double acute accent.

== In Unicode ==
The character has the Unicode codepoints

- U+00D6 Ö LATIN CAPITAL LETTER O WITH DIAERESIS
- U+00F6 ö LATIN SMALL LETTER O WITH DIAERESIS
- U+1DF3 ᷳ COMBINING LATIN SMALL LETTER O WITH DIAERESIS

== See also ==
- Diaeresis (diacritic)
- O with diaeresis (Cyrillic)
- Ø, the character used in some Nordic languages for similar sounds
- Metal umlaut
