= Ľ =

Latin letter L with caron

L with caron in Doulos SIL

Ľ (minuscule: ľ) is a grapheme found officially in the Slovak alphabet. It is an L with a caron diacritical mark, normally ⟨ˇ⟩ but simplified to look like an apostrophe with L, and is pronounced as palatal lateral approximant [ʎ], similar to the "lj-" sound in Ljubljana or million.

== Slovak ==
Examples include:

- podnikateľ: "businessman"; skladateľ: "composer"; bádateľ: "researcher"
- ľalia: "Lilium"; ľan: "linen"; ľuľkovec zlomocný: "Atropa belladonna"
- ľad: "ice"; ľadovec: "iceberg"
- Poľana, mountain range in Central Slovakia; Sečovská Poľanka, historical name for village Sečovská Polianka in Eastern Slovakia used from 1920 until 1948
- Ján Figeľ, Slovak politician who was European Commissioner for Education, Training and Culture from 2004 to 2009
- Jozef Ľupták, teacher who took part in the Slovak National Uprising and was killed in action on 27 October 1944

An approximation using an apostrophe ' is sometimes found in some English texts, for example "L'udovit Stur" instead of the correct Slovak L-caron in Ľudovít Štúr. This incorrect usage is sometimes the result of an OCR error.

== See also ==
- ʎ
- љ
- lj
