= Ó =

Latin letter O with acute accent

Latin letter O with acute

Ó (minuscule: ó), known as O-acute, is a Latin-script character composed of the letter O and an acute accent. It is found in the Czech, Dobrujan Tatar, Emilian-Romagnol, Faroese, Hungarian, Icelandic, Kashubian, Polish, Slovak, Karakalpak, and Sorbian languages. The symbol also appears in the Afrikaans, Catalan, Dutch, Irish, Nynorsk, Bokmål, Occitan, Portuguese, Spanish, Italian and Galician languages as a variant of the letter "o". It usually represents a vowel sound longer than or slightly different from that represented by plain "o", although in some cases its sound is notably different (as in modern Polish, where it is pronounced the same as "u"). In some cases it represents the vowel "o" with a particular tone (for example, a high rising tone in Vietnamese). It is sometimes also used in English for loanwords.

== Usage in various languages ==
=== Chinese ===
In Chinese pinyin ó is the yángpíng tone (阳平, high-rising tone) of "o".

=== Czech and Slovak ===
Ó is the 24th letter of the Czech alphabet and the 28th letter of the Slovak alphabet. It represents /oː/.

=== Dobrujan Tatar ===
Ó is the 21st letter of Dobrujan Tatar alphabet, represents the mid rounded half-advanced ATR or soft vowel /ɵ/ as in "tór" [t̶ɵr̶] 'background'

=== Dutch ===
In Dutch, the acute Ó accent is used to mark different meanings for words, for example voor and vóór ("for" / "before"), or vóórkomen and voorkómen ("to occur" / "to prevent").

=== Emilian ===
In Emilian, ó is used to represent [o], e.g. sótt [sotː] "dry".

=== Faroese ===
Ó is the 18th letter of the Faroese alphabet and represents /œ/ or /ɔuː/.

=== Hungarian ===
Ó is the 25th letter of the Hungarian alphabet. It represents the long vowel /oː/.

=== Icelandic ===
Ó is the 19th letter of the Icelandic alphabet and represents /oṷ/.

=== Irish ===
Ó is widely used in Irish where it has various meanings:

- the preposition ó "from"
- the patronymic term Ó "grandson, (usually male) descendant, first or second cousin" (variants: Ua, Uí, Í Uaí). When Irish names were anglicized, the Ó commonly was either dropped or written as O'.
- the interjection ó "oh"

=== Italian ===
In Italian, ó is an optional symbol (especially used in dictionaries) sometimes used to indicate that a stressed o should be pronounced with a close sound: córso [ˈkorso], "course", as opposed to còrso [ˈkɔrso], "Corsican" (but both are commonly written with no accent marks when the context is clear). A similar process may occur with é and è, as in *pésca, "fishing", and *pèsca "peach", in which the accent mark is not written (both are written as pesca).

=== Kashubian ===
Ó is the 23rd letter of the Kashubian alphabet and represents /o/. It also represents /u/ in southern dialects.

=== Kazakh ===
It was proposed in 2018 that Ó should be one of their Latin alphabet to replace Ө and represents /œ/ (or /ʷœ/). The proposal was modified to Ö in late 2019.

=== Karakalpak ===
Ó/ó is the 21st letter of the Karakalpak alphabet and represents /ʷœ/.

=== Polish ===
Ó is the 21st letter of the Polish alphabet, and represents /u/. Historically it represented /oː/ but morphed to /u/ over time (similar to English "oo").

=== Portuguese ===
In Portuguese, ó is used to mark a stressed /ɔ/ in words whose stressed syllable is in an unpredictable location within the word, as in "pó" (dust) and "óculos" (glasses). If the location of the stressed syllable is predictable, the acute accent is not used. Ó /ɔ/ contrasts with ô /o/.

=== Romagnol ===
In Romagnol, ó is used to represent [oː], e.g. alóra [aˈloːra] "then".

=== Scottish Gaelic ===
Ó was once widely used in Scottish, but it has now been largely superseded by "ò". It can still be seen in certain writings but is no longer used in standard orthography.

=== Spanish ===
Ó is used in the Spanish language to denote an 'o' vowel with abnormal stress.

=== Sorbian ===
Ó represents /uʊ/ in Upper Sorbian and represents /ɛ/ or /ɨ/ in, especially, Lower Sorbian.

=== Vietnamese ===
In Vietnamese alphabet ó is the sắc tone (high-rising tone) of "o".

== Character mappings ==
- U+00D3 Ó LATIN CAPITAL LETTER O WITH ACUTE
- U+00F3 ó LATIN SMALL LETTER O WITH ACUTE

== See also ==
- Acute accent
