= Ŕ =

Latin letter R with acute accent

Latin R with acute

Ŕ (minuscule: ŕ) is a letter of the Lower Sorbian and Slovak alphabets, Ukrainian Latin alphabet and Proto-Turkic orthography. It is formed from R with the addition of an acute. Their Unicode codepoints are U+0154 Ŕ LATIN CAPITAL LETTER R WITH ACUTE (&Racute;) and U+0155 ŕ LATIN SMALL LETTER R WITH ACUTE (&racute;). The PostScript names are Racute and racute.

== Slovak ==
In Slovak ⟨ŕ⟩ is used to represent /r̩ː/, the geminate syllabic alveolar trill.

== Lower Sorbian and Võro ==
It is used in Lower Sorbian and Võro to represent /rʲ/, the palatalised alveolar trill.

== Basque ==
In Sabino Arana's orthography of the Basque language, ⟨ŕ⟩ was used for the /r/ contrasting with ⟨r⟩ which was used for /ɾ/. However, in the standard Basque alphabet, /r/ is represented with ⟨r⟩ in syllable-final positions and ⟨rr⟩ between vowels.

== See also ==
- Ř
- Rz (digraph)

== Encodings ==
Character information
Preview	Ŕ		ŕ	
Unicode name	LATIN CAPITAL LETTER R WITH ACUTE		LATIN SMALL LETTER R WITH ACUTE	
Encodings	decimal	hex	dec	hex
Unicode	340	U+0154	341	U+0155
UTF-8	197 148	C5 94	197 149	C5 95
Numeric character reference	&#340;	&#x154;	&#341;	&#x155;
Named character reference	&Racute;		&racute;	
