= Ä =

Latin letter A with two dots

Latin letter A with diaeresis

Ä (minuscule: ä) is a Latin-script character. It is composed of the letter A and an umlaut or a diaeresis. It is used mainly in Northern European and Central Asian languages. In the International Phonetic Alphabet, it is sometimes used to represent the open central unrounded vowel.

== General usage ==
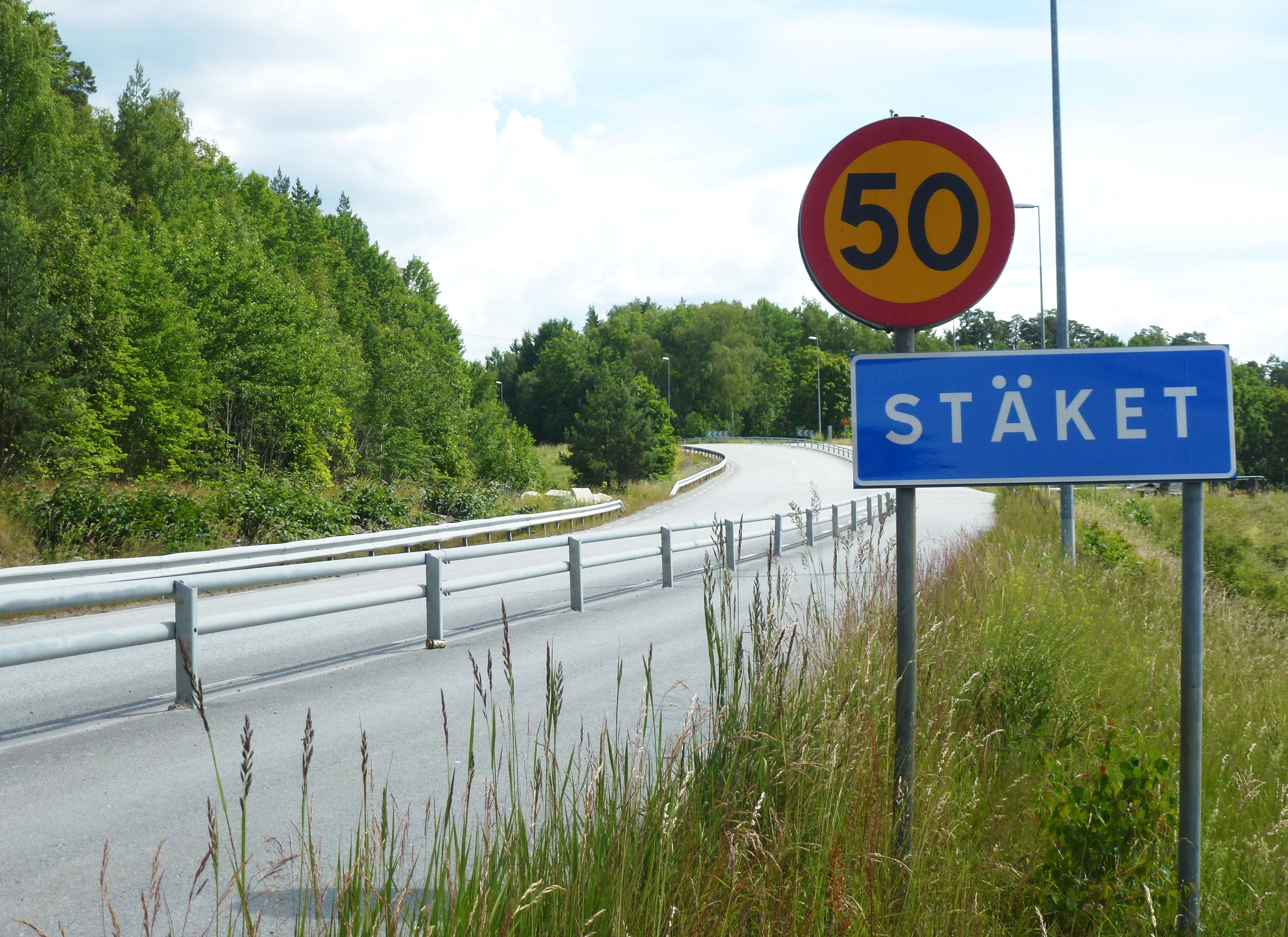
Sign of Stäket, a residential area in Järfälla Municipality, Sweden

The letter Ä occurs in the writing systems of languages around the world, though its use is most prominent in Northern Europe and Central Asia. European languages that use ä include Swedish, German, Luxembourgish, Limburgish (in some orthographies), North Frisian, Saterlandic, Finnish, Estonian, Skolt Sámi, Karelian, Emilian, Inari Sámi and Slovak.

Ä appears in the Common Turkic Alphabet, and some Latin-based alphabets in Central Asia, including Tatar, Kazakh, Gagauz, and Turkmen use it. The letter is also used in some Romani alphabets and the Austronesian language Rotuman.

It generally denotes an unrounded vowel that is front or central in the mouth, and low or mid height. In Finnish, Kazakh, Turkmen and Tatar, this is always [æ]; in Swedish and Estonian, regional variation, as well as the letter's position in a word, allows for either [æ] or [ɛ]. In German and Slovak Ä stands for [ɛ] (or the archaic [æ]).

In the romanization of Nanjing Mandarin, Ä stands for [ɛ]. The Lessing-Othmer romanization scheme also used ä.

== Nordic countries ==
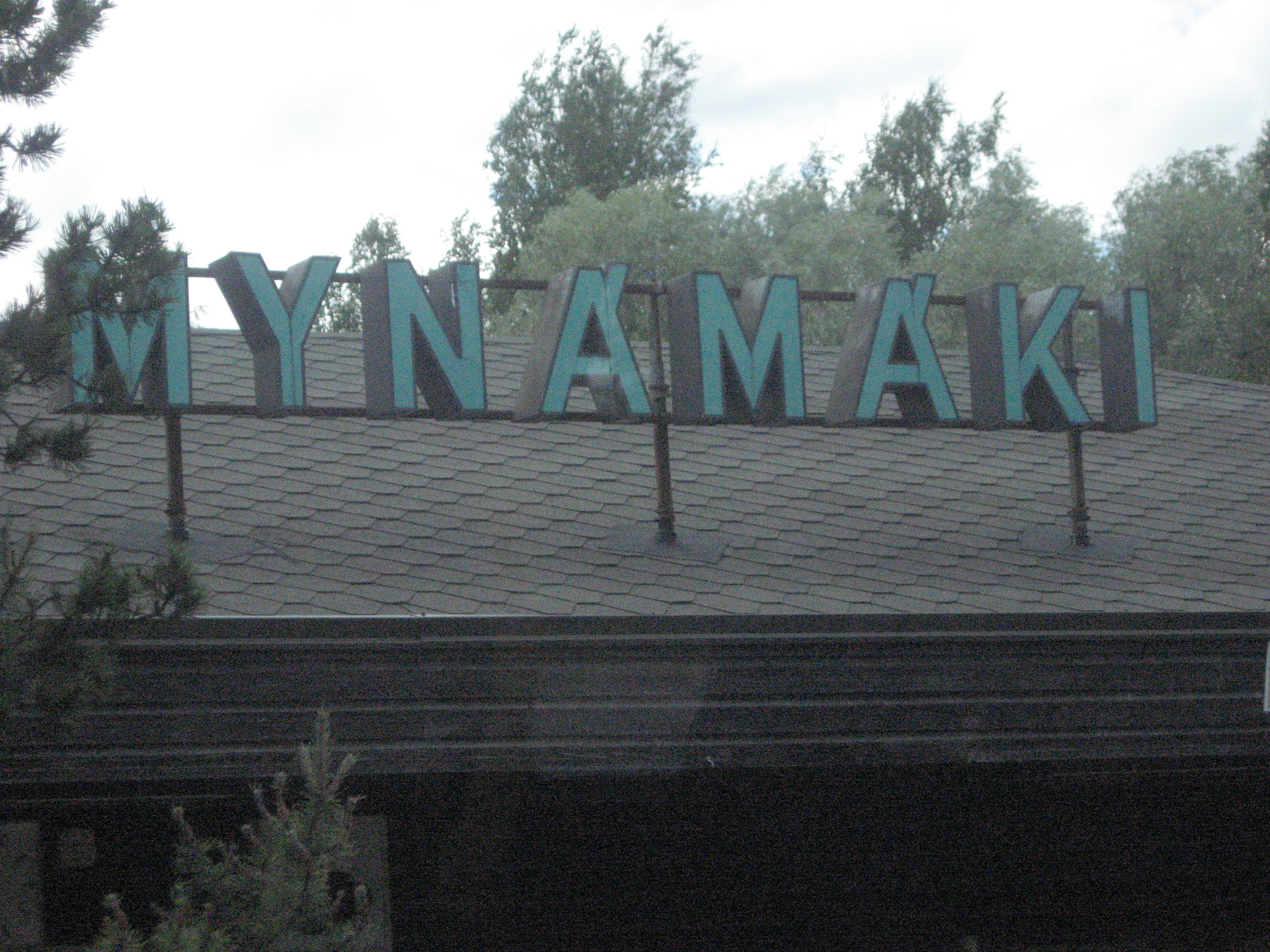
The sign at the bus station of the Finnish town Mynämäki, illustrating an artistic variation of the letter Ä

In the Nordic countries, the vowel sound [æ] was originally written as "Æ" when Christianisation caused the former Vikings to start using the Latin alphabet around A.D. 1100. The letter Ä arose in German and later in Swedish from originally writing the E in AE on top of the A, which with time became simplified as two dots, consistent with the Sütterlin script. In the Icelandic, Faroese, Danish and Norwegian alphabets, "Æ" is still used instead of Ä.

Finnish adopted the Swedish alphabet during the 700 years that Finland was part of Sweden. Although the idea of the Germanic umlaut does not exist in Finnish, the phoneme /æ/ does. Estonian gained the letter through extensive exposure to German, with Low German throughout centuries of effective Baltic German rule, and to Swedish, during the 160 years of Estonia as a part of the Swedish Empire until 1721.

== Emilian ==
Emilian, spoken in northern Italy, uses ä to represent [æ], occurring in some dialects, e.g. Bolognese bän [bæŋ] "good, well" and żänt [zæŋt] "people".

== Common Turkic Alphabet ==
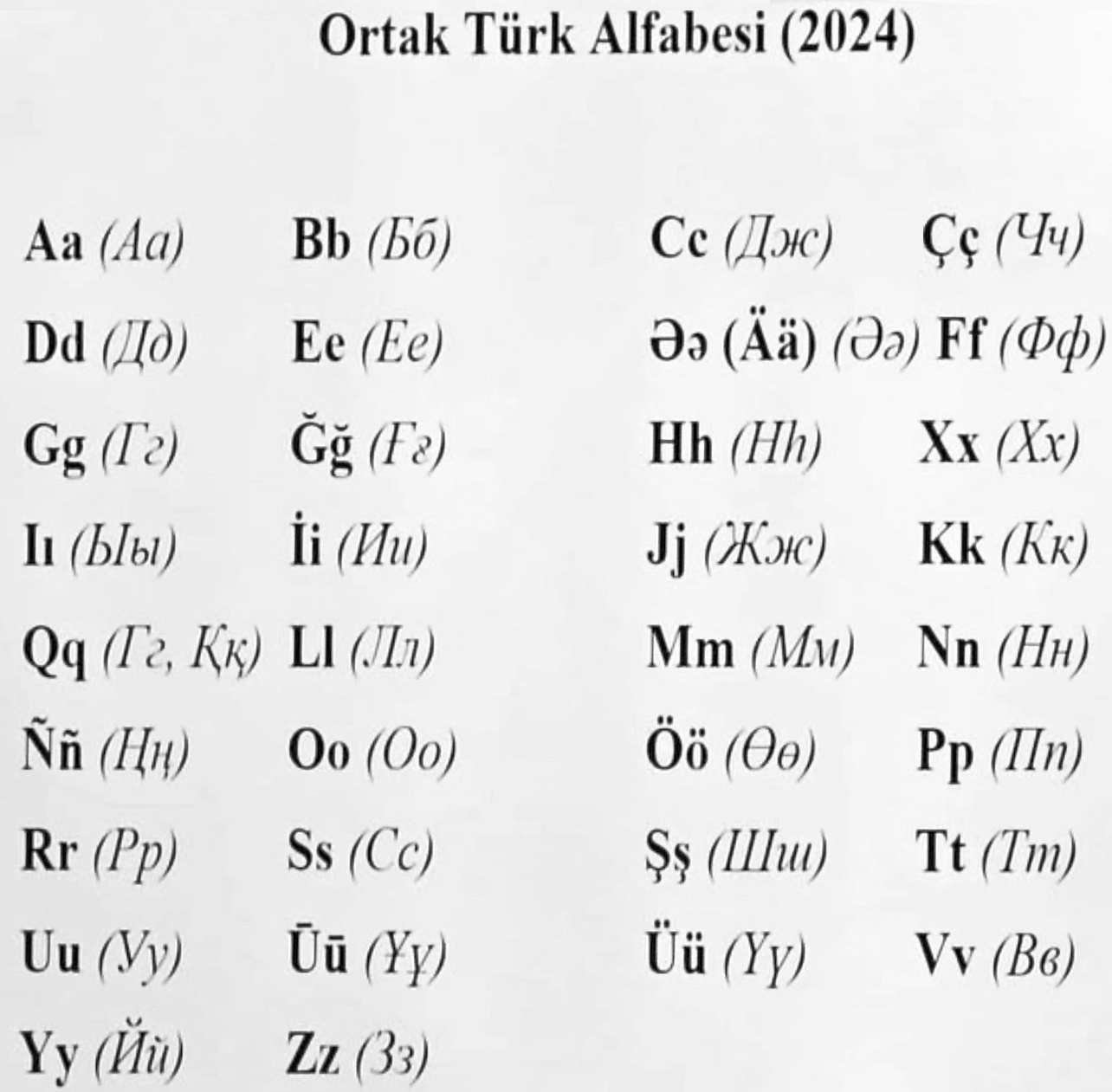
The Common Turkic Alphabet as adopted in 2024, which allows for the use of either Ä or Ə.

Ä is a letter in the 2024 update of the 34-letter Common Turkic Alphabet, a project that seeks to create a Latin-based alphabet that is expansive enough to be used across all Turkic languages. Ä coexists with Ə in the CTA, both of which can represent the near-open front unrounded vowel [æ], with different languages picking one or the other.

== Kazakh ==
In 2021, Kazakhstan approved a multi-year transition to a Latin-based alphabet for the Kazakh language, to be completed by 2031. Based on President Kassym-Jomart Tokayev's 2021 decree finalizing the proposed alphabet, ä will represent the IPA sound /æ/, replacing the Cyrillic letter Ә.

== Tatar ==
The Turkic Tatar language is written officially in the Cyrillic script, but a Latin based alphabet is in limited use.

The Tatar Cyrillic letter ә [æ] has been usually transliterated as ä, but in 2024, the Common Turkic Alphabet replaced it with ə, which is also used in Azeri Latin script. Tatar activists writing in the Latin script on social media have preferred to use this instead of ä as well; the main argument being that ä is aesthetically less pleasing when Tatar already owns a lot of umlauts (күбәләкләр, kübäläklär, kübələklər; 'butterflies').

In Finland, while ä is found in Finnish, the Tatar community has traditionally tried to use only letters found in Turkish, and thus, have replaced it with e. This has left both the [e] and [ɯ] (ı) sounds as ı (keçkenä / keçkenə, kıçkıne; 'small' (Note: This mixes Tatar front and back vowels; if using e as [æ], a more correct spelling would be kiçkine, which then leaves letter i as the e-sound.)). Nowadays however the spelling has had more influence from Tatarstan.

== Cyrillic ==
Ӓ is used in some alphabets invented in the 19th century which are based on the Cyrillic script. These include Mari, Altay and the Keräşen Tatar alphabet.

== Umlaut-A ==
Ä in German Sign Language

A similar glyph, A with umlaut, appears in the German alphabet. It represents the umlauted form of a [aː] ([a] when short), resulting in [ɛː] (or [eː] for many speakers) in the case of the long [aː] and [ɛ] in the case of the short [a]. In German, it is called Ä (pronounced [ɛː]) or Umlaut-Ä. Referring to the glyph as A-Umlaut is an uncommon practice, and would be ambiguous, as that term also refers to Germanic a-mutation. The digraph ⟨äu⟩ is used for the fronting diphthong [ɔʏ] (otherwise spelled with ⟨eu⟩) when it acts as the umlauted form of the backing diphthong [aʊ] (spelled ⟨au⟩); compare Baum [ˈbaʊm] 'tree' with Bäume [ˈbɔʏmə] 'trees'. In German dictionaries, the letter is collated together with A, while in German phonebooks the letter is collated as AE. The letter also occurs in some languages which have adopted German names or spellings, but is not a part of these languages' alphabets. It has recently been introduced in revivalist Ulster-Scots writing.

The letter was originally an A with a lowercase e on top, which was later stylized to two dots.

In other languages that do not have the letter as part of the regular alphabet or in limited character sets such as US-ASCII, Ä is frequently replaced with the two-letter combination "Ae".

== Phonetic alphabets ==
- In the International Phonetic Alphabet, ä represents an open central unrounded vowel. The letter does not appear on the IPA chart, as the need to distinguish the open central vowel from an open front/back vowel is rare. It is instead a combination of IPA symbols: the open front unrounded vowel [a], modified by the centralization diacritic ◌̈.
- in the Rheinische Dokumenta, a phonetic alphabet for many West Central German, Low Rhenish, and a few related languages, "ä" represents the sound [ɛ].

== Typography ==
Johann Martin Schleyer proposed alternate forms for Ä and ä (Ꞛ and ꞛ, respectively) in Volapük but they were rarely used.

Historically A-diaeresis was written as an A with two dots above the letter. A-umlaut was written as an A with a small e written above (Aͤ aͤ): this minute e degenerated to two vertical bars in medieval handwriting (A̎ a̎). In most later handwritings these bars in turn nearly became dots.

Æ, a highly similar ligature evolving from the same origin as Ä, evolved in the Icelandic, Danish and Norwegian alphabets. The Æ ligature was also common in Old English, but had largely disappeared in Middle English.

In modern typography there was insufficient space on typewriters and later computer keyboards to allow for both A-diaeresis (also representing Ä) and A-umlaut. Since they looked near-identical the two glyphs were combined, which was also done in computer character encodings such as ISO 8859-1. As a result, there was no way to differentiate between the different characters. Unicode theoretically provides a solution by using the combining grapheme joiner (CGJ; U+034F), but recommends it only for highly specialized applications.

Ä is also used to substitute Ə (the letter schwa) in situations where that glyph is unavailable, as used in the Tatar and Azeri languages. Turkmen started to use Ä officially instead of the schwa from 1993 onwards.

== Computer use ==
Character information
Preview	Ä		ä	
Unicode name	LATIN CAPITAL LETTER A WITH DIAERESIS		LATIN SMALL LETTER A WITH DIAERESIS	
Encodings	decimal	hex	dec	hex
Unicode	196	U+00C4	228	U+00E4
UTF-8	195 132	C3 84	195 164	C3 A4
Numeric character reference	&#196;	&#xC4;	&#228;	&#xE4;
Named character reference	&Auml;		&auml;	

== See also ==
- Æ
- Å
- Æ
- Œ
- Ø
- Ö
