= CSX Indic character set =

LaTeX character set

The CSX Indic character set, or the Classical Sanskrit eXtended Indic Character Set, is used by LaTeX represent text used in the Romanization of Sanskrit. It has no association with American railroad company CSX Transportation. It is an extension of the CS Indic character set, and is based on Code Page 437. An extended version is the CSX+ Indic character set. Michael Everson made a font in this character set for the Macintosh.

== Code page layout ==
CSX
	0	1	2	3	4	5	6	7	8	9	A	B	C	D	E	F
8x	Ç	ü	é	â	ä	à	å	ç	ê	ë	è	ï	î	ì	Ä	Å
9x	É	æ	Æ	ô	ö	ò	û	ù	ÿ	Ö	Ü	¢	£	¥		ṟ
Ax	á	í	ó	ú	ñ	Ñ	l̃	ṁ	ā̆	ī̆	ū̆	ā̃	ī̃	ṉ	«	»
Bx						ā́	ā̀	ī́	ī̀					ū́	ū̀	
Cx							ṛ́	ṛ̀								ṝ́
Dx	ã	ĩ	ũ	ẽ	õ	ĕ	ŏ	ḻ	ū̃							
Ex	ā	ß	Ā	ī	Ī	ū	Ū	ṛ	Ṛ	ṝ	Ṝ	ḷ	Ḷ	ḹ	Ḹ	ṅ
Fx	Ṅ	ṭ	Ṭ	ḍ	Ḍ	ṇ	Ṇ	ś	Ś	ṣ	Ṣ		ṃ	Ṃ	ḥ	Ḥ

Note that some fonts have ā̃ (U+0101 LATIN SMALL LETTER A WITH MACRON, U+0303 COMBINING TILDE) at code point 171 (0xAC), ī̃ (U+012B LATIN SMALL LETTER I WITH MACRON, U+0303 COMBINING TILDE) at code point 172 (0xAD), and ū̃ (U+016B LATIN SMALL LETTER U WITH MACRON, U+0303 COMBINING TILDE) at code point 216 (0xD8).

== History ==
See the shared history of the CS character set.
