= CS Indic character set =

Classical Sanskrit character encoding

The CS Indic character set, or the Classical Sanskrit Indic Character Set, is used to represent text used in the Romanization of Sanskrit. It is used in fonts, and is a modification of Code Page 437. Extended versions are the CSX Indic character set and the CSX+ Indic character set.

== Code page layout ==
CS Indic
	0	1	2	3	4	5	6	7	8	9	A	B	C	D	E	F
8x																
9x																
Ax					ñ	Ñ	l̃	ṁ								
Bx																
Cx																
Dx																
Ex	ā		Ā	ī	Ī	ū	Ū	ṛ	Ṛ	ṝ	Ṝ	ḷ	Ḷ	ḹ	Ḹ	ṅ
Fx	Ṅ	ṭ	Ṭ	ḍ	Ḍ	ṇ	Ṇ	ś	Ś	ṣ	Ṣ		ṃ	Ṃ	ḥ	Ḥ

== History ==
The CS and CSX character sets were defined during an informal discussion over a beer between John Smith, Dominik Wujastyk and Ronald E. Emmerick during the World Sanskrit Conference in Vienna, 1990. A few months later they were endorsed by several other Indologists including Harry Falk, Richard Lariviere, G. Jan Meulenbeld, Hideaki Nakatani, Muneo Tokunaga, and Michio Yano.
