= CSX+ Indic character set =

LaTeX character set

The CSX+ Indic character set, or the Classical Sanskrit eXtended Plus Indic Character Set, is used by LaTeX to represent text used in the Romanization of Sanskrit. It is an extension of the CSX Indic character set (but removes ÿ and the punctuation marks ¢, £, ¥, «, and »), which in turn is an extension of the CS Indic character set, and is based on Code Page 437. It fixes an issue with Windows programs, by moving á from code point 160 (0xA0) (which is problematic because it displays a regular space on Windows), to code point 158 (0x9E).

== Code page layout ==
CSX+
	0	1	2	3	4	5	6	7	8	9	A	B	C	D	E	F
8x	Ç	ü	é	â	ä	à	å	ç	ê	ë	è	ï	î	ì	Ä	Å
9x	É	æ	Æ	ô	ö	ò	û	ù	ǣ	Ö	Ü	ŭ	ē̃	r̥	á	ṟ
Ax	NBSP	í	ó	ú	ñ	Ñ	l̃	ṁ	ā̆	ī̆	ū̆	ā̃	ī̃	ṉ	r̥̄	l̥
Bx	l̥̄	ŕ̥	r̥̀	r̥̄́	m̆	ā́	ā̀	ī́	ī̀	ē	ō	R̥	ẏ	ū́	ū̀	r̆
Cx	ō̃	m̐	ṯ	Ē	Ō	n̆	ṛ́	ṛ̀	K͟h	ḵ	SP	Ǣ	k͟h	ġ	ĉ	ṝ́
Dx	ã	ĩ	ũ	ẽ	õ	ĕ	ŏ	ḻ	ū̃	Ġ	Ĉ	ẖ	ḫ	–	—	“
Ex	ā	ß	Ā	ī	Ī	ū	Ū	ṛ	Ṛ	ṝ	Ṝ	ḷ	Ḷ	ḹ	Ḹ	ṅ
Fx	Ṅ	ṭ	Ṭ	ḍ	Ḍ	ṇ	Ṇ	ś	Ś	ṣ	Ṣ	”	ṃ	Ṃ	ḥ	Ḥ
