= DIN 31635 =

Transliteration of the Arabic alphabet

DIN 31635 is a Deutsches Institut für Normung (DIN) standard for the transliteration of the Arabic alphabet adopted in 1982. It is based on the rules of the Deutsche Morgenländische Gesellschaft (DMG) as modified by the International Orientalist Congress 1935 in Rome. The most important differences from English-based systems were doing away with j, because it stood for /dʒ/ in the English-speaking world and for /j/ in the German-speaking world and the entire absence of digraphs like th, dh, kh, gh, sh. Its acceptance relies less on its official status than on its elegance (one sign for each Arabic letter) and the Geschichte der arabischen Literatur manuscript catalogue of Carl Brockelmann and the dictionary of Hans Wehr. Today it is used in most German-language publications of Arabic and Islamic studies.

Along with rules for the Arabic language, it also includes transliteration standards for Ottoman Turkish, Persian, Kurdish, Urdu, and Pashto.

== Table ==
The 28 letters:

Arabic letters	ء / ا	ب	ت	ث	ج	ح	خ	د	ذ	ر	ز	س	ش	ص	ض	ط	ظ	ع	غ	ف	ق	ك	ل	م	ن	ه	و	ي / ى
DIN 31635	ʾ / ā	b	t	ṯ	ǧ	ḥ	ḫ	d	ḏ	r	z	s	š	ṣ	ḍ	ṭ	ẓ	ʿ	ġ	f	q	k	l	m	n	h	w / ū	y / ī
ALA-LC	ʼ / ā	b	t	th	j	ḥ	kh	d	dh	r	z	s	sh	ṣ	ḍ	ṭ	ẓ	ʻ	gh	f	q	k	l	m	n	h	w / ū	y / ī
IPA (MSA)	ʔ, aː	b	t	θ	dʒ ɡ ʒ	ħ	x	d	ð	r	z	s	ʃ	sˤ	dˤ	tˤ	ðˤ zˤ	ʕ	ɣ	f	q	k	l	m	n	h	w, uː	j, iː

== Rules ==
The ḥarakāt (fatḥah, kasrah and ḍammah) are transliterated as a, i and u. A šaddah results in a geminate (consonant written twice). The article is written with the sun letters assimilated.

An ʾalif marking /aː/ is transliterated as ā. The letter (ﺓ) tāʾ marbūṭah is transliterated as word-final -h normally, or -t in a word in the construct state.

Hamzah has many variants, أ إ ء ئ ؤ; depending on its position, all of them are transliterated as ⟨ʾ⟩. The initial ʾalif (ا) without a hamzah is not transliterated using ʾ initially, only the initial vowel is transliterated (if pronounced): i-.

(ﻯ) ʾalif maqṣūrah appears as ā, transliterating it indistinguishable from ʾalif. Long vowels /iː/ and /uː/ are transliterated as ī and ū. The nisbah suffix /ij(j), ijja/ appears as -iyy, -iyyah although the former is normally transliterated as -ī, and nunation is ignored in transliteration. A hyphen - is used to separate clitics (the article, the prepositions and the conjunction) from words to which they are attached.

The Eastern Arabic numerals (٠ ١ ٢ ٣ ٤ ٥ ٦ ٧ ٨ ٩) are rendered as western Arabic numerals (0 1 2 3 4 5 6 7 8 9).

== See also ==
- Romanization of Arabic
- ISO 233
- Hans Wehr transliteration
- Arabic phonology
- Help:IPA/Arabic (Wikipedia help)
