= Hans Wehr transliteration =

System for transliteration of the Arabic alphabet into the Latin alphabet

The Hans Wehr transliteration system is a system for transliteration of the Arabic alphabet into the Latin alphabet used in the Hans Wehr dictionary (1952; in English 1961). The system was modified somewhat in the English editions. It is printed in lowercase italics. It marks some consonants using diacritics (underdot, macron below, and caron) rather than digraphs, and writes long vowels with macrons.

The transliteration of the Arabic alphabet:

Letter	Name	Transliteration	Eng. ed.
ء	hamza	ʼ	
ا	alif	ā	
ب	bāʼ	b	
ت	tāʼ	t	
ث	ṯāʼ	ṯ	
ج	ǧīm	ǧ	j
ح	ḥāʼ	ḥ	
خ	ḫāʼ	ḫ	ḵ
د	dāl	d	
ذ	ḏāl	ḏ	
ر	rāʼ	r	
ز	zāy	z	
س	sīn	s	
ش	šīn	š	
ص	ṣād	ṣ	
ض	ḍād	ḍ	
ط	ṭāʼ	ṭ	
ظ	ẓāʼ	ẓ	
ع	ʽain	ʽ	
غ	ġain	ġ	ḡ
ف	fāʼ	f	
ق	qāf	q	
ك	kāf	k	
ل	lām	l	
م	mīm	m	
ن	nūn	n	
ه	hāʼ	h	
و	wāw	w, u, or ū	
ي	yāʼ	y, i, or ī	

- Hamza (ء) is represented as ʼ in the middle and at the end of a word. At the beginning of a word, it is not represented.
- The tāʼ marbūṭa (ة) is normally not represented, and words ending in it simply have a final -a. It is, however, represented with a t when it is the ending of the first noun of an iḍāfa and with an h when it appears after a long ā.
- Native Arabic long vowels: ā ī ū
- Long vowels in borrowed words: ē ō
- Short vowels: fatḥa is represented as a, kasra as i and ḍamma as u. (see short vowel marks)
- Wāw and yāʼ are represented as u and i after fatḥa: ʻain "eye", yaum "day".
- Non-standard Arabic consonants: p (پ), ž (ژ), g (گ)
- Alif maqṣūra (ى): ā
- Madda (آ): ā at the beginning of a word, ʼā in the middle or at the end
- A final yāʼ (ي), the nisba adjective ending, is represented as ī normally, but as īy when the ending contains the third consonant of the root. This difference is not written in the Arabic.
- Capitalization: The transliteration uses no capitals, even for proper names.
- Definite article: The Arabic definite article الـ is represented as al- except where assimilation occurs: al- + šams is transliterated aš-šams (see sun and moon letters). The a in al- is omitted after a final a (as in lamma šamla l-qatīʻ "to round up the herd") or changed to i after a feminine third person singular perfect verb form (as in kašafat il-ḥarbu ʻan sāqin "war flared up").

== See also ==
- Romanization of Arabic (compare other systems, such as ALA-LC or DIN 31635)
- Arabic phonology
- Help:IPA/Arabic

== Bibliography ==
- Wehr, Hans. Dictionary of Modern Written Arabic.
