= International uniformity of braille alphabets =

The goal of braille uniformity is to unify the braille alphabets of the world as much as possible, so that literacy in one braille alphabet readily transfers to another. Unification was first achieved by a convention of the International Congress on Work for the Blind in 1878, where it was decided to replace the mutually incompatible national conventions of the time with the French values of the basic Latin alphabet, both for languages that use Latin-based alphabets and, through their Latin equivalents, for languages that use other scripts. However, the unification did not address letters beyond these 26, leaving French and German Braille partially incompatible and as braille spread to new languages with new needs, national conventions again became disparate. A second round of unification was undertaken under the auspices of UNESCO in 1951, setting the foundation for international braille usage today.

== Numerical order ==
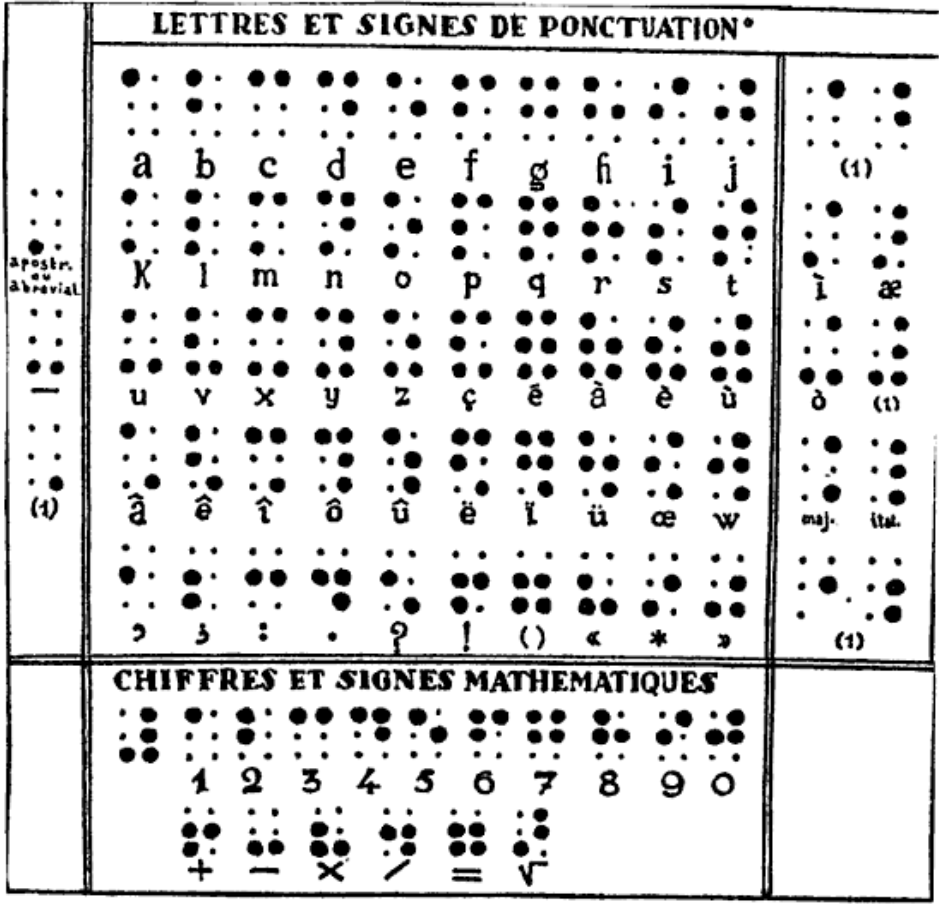
An early braille chart, displaying the numeric order of the characters

Braille arranged his characters in decades (groups of ten), and assigned the 25 letters of the French alphabet to them in order. The characters beyond the first 25 are the principal source of variation today.

In the first decade, only the top four dots are used; the two supplementary characters have dots only on the right. These patterns are repeated for the second decade, with the addition of a diacritic at dot 3; for the third, at dots 3 and 6; for the fourth, at 6; and for the fifth decade, by duplicating the first decade within the lower four dots.

diacritic		main sequence										suppl.	
1st decade	⠀	⠁	⠃	⠉	⠙	⠑	⠋	⠛	⠓	⠊	⠚	⠈	⠘
2nd decade	⠄	⠅	⠇	⠍	⠝	⠕	⠏	⠟	⠗	⠎	⠞	⠌	⠜
3rd decade	⠤	⠥	⠧	⠭	⠽	⠵	⠯	⠿	⠷	⠮	⠾	⠬	⠼
4th decade	⠠	⠡	⠣	⠩	⠹	⠱	⠫	⠻	⠳	⠪	⠺	⠨	⠸
5th decade		⠂	⠆	⠒	⠲	⠢	⠖	⠶	⠦	⠔	⠴	⠐	⠰

== Unification of 1878 ==
Braille is in its origin a numeric code. Louis Braille applied the characters in numerical order to the French alphabet in alphabetical order. As braille spread to other languages, the numeric order was retained and applied to the local script. Therefore, where the alphabetical order differed from that of French, the new braille alphabet would be incompatible with French Braille. For example, French was based on a 25-letter alphabet without a w. When braille was adopted for English in the United States, the letters were applied directly to the English alphabet, so that braille letter of French x became English w, French y became English x, French z English y, and French ç English z. In the United Kingdom, however, French Braille was adopted without such reordering. Therefore, any English book published in braille needed to be typeset separately for the United States and the United Kingdom. Similarly, the letters for Egyptian Arabic Braille were assigned their forms based on their nearest French equivalents, so that for example Arabic d had the same braille letters as French d. For Algerian Arabic Braille, however, the braille characters were assigned to the Arabic alphabet according to the Arabic alphabetical order, so that Algerian d was the same character as Egyptian h. Thus an Arabic book published in Algeria was utterly unintelligible to blind Egyptians and vice versa.

In addition, in other alphabets braille characters were assigned to print letters according to frequency, so that the simplest letters would be the most frequent, making the writing of braille significantly more efficient. However, the letter frequencies of German were very different from those of English, so that frequency-based German braille alphabets were utterly alien to readers of frequency-based American Braille, as well as to numerically based German, English, and French Braille.

The 1878 congress, convening representatives from France, Britain, Germany, and Egypt, decided that the original French assignments should be the norm for those countries:

[Due to] the tendencies in America and Germany to re-arrange the Braille alphabet [to fit their own alphabetical orders], the Congress decided ... that it should be adopted ... with the values of its symbols unaltered from those of the original French.

Gradually the various reordered and frequency-based alphabets fell out of use elsewhere as well.

This decision covered the basic letters of the French alphabet at the time; w had been appended with the extra letters, so the 26 letters of the Basic Latin alphabet are slightly out of numeric order:

a	b	c	d	e	f	g	h	i	j	k	l	m
n	o	p	q	r	s	t	u	v	x	y	z	w

For non-Latin scripts, correspondences are generally based, where possible, on their historical connections or phonetic/transcription values. For example, Greek γ gamma is written ⠛ g, as it is romanized, not ⠉ c, as it is ordered in the alphabet or as it is related historically to the Latin letter c. Occasional assignments are made on other grounds, such as the International Greek Braille ω omega, which is written ⠺ w, as in beta code and internet chat alphabets, due to the graphic resemblance of Latin w and Greek ω.

=== Basic correspondences ===
Correspondences among the basic letters of representative modern braille alphabets include:

Letter:		⠁	⠃	⠉	⠙	⠑	⠋	⠛	⠓	⠊	⠚	⠅	⠇	⠍	⠝	⠕	⠏	⠟	⠗	⠎	⠞	⠥	⠧	⠭	⠽	⠵	(...)	⠺
Values	French	a	b	c	d	e	f	g	h	i	j	k	l	m	n	o	p	q	r	s	t	u	v	x	y	z		w
Values	Hungarian	a	b	c	d	e	f	g	h	i	j	k	l	m	n	o	p	ö	r	s	t	u	v	x	y	–		w
Values	Albanian	a	b	c	d	e	f	g	h	i	j	k	l	m	n	o	p	rr	r	s	t	u	v	x	y	z		–
Values	Greek	α a	β b	–	δ d	ε e	φ ph	γ g	χ ch	ι i	ω ô	κ k	λ l	μ m	ν n	ο o	π p	–	ρ r	σ s	τ t	ου ou	–	ξ ks	υ y	ζ z		–
Values	Russian	а a	б b	ц ts	д d	е e	ф f	г g	х kh	и i	ж zh	к k	л l	м m	н n	о o	п p	ч ch	р r	с s	т t	у u	–	щ shch	–	з z		в v
Values	Armenian	ա a	պ p	ջ ǰ	տ t	–	ֆ f	կ k	հ h	ի i	ճ č̣	–	լ l	մ m	ն n	օ ò	բ b	գ g	ր r	ս s	թ tʻ	ը ë	վ v	խ x	ե e	զ z		ւ w
Values	Hebrew	א ʼ	בּ b	–	ד d	–	פ f	ג g	ה h	ִי i	י y	כּ k	ל l	מ m	נ n	וֹ o	פּ p	ק q	ר r	ס s	ט ṭ	וּ u	ב v	ח ch	–	ז z		ו v
Values	Arabic	ا ā	ب b	–	د d	ـِ i	ف f	–	ه h	ي ī	ج j	ك k	ل l	م m	ن n	–	–	ق q	ر r	س s	ت t	ـُ u	–	خ kh	ئ ’y	ز z		و ū
Values	Sanskrit/ Nepali/ Hindi	अ a	ब b	च c	द d	ए ē	फ़ f	ग g	ह h	इ i	ज j	क k	ल l	म m	न n	ओ ō	प p	क्ष kṣ	र r	स s	त t	उ u	व v	ऒ o	य y	ज़ z		ठ ṭh
Values	Tibetan	ཨ a	བ b	ཁ kh	ད d	ཨེ e	–	ག g	ཧ h	ཨི i	ཡ y	ཀ k	ར l	མ m	ན n	ཨོ o	པ p	ཇ j	ར r	ཟ z	ཏ t	ཨུ u	–	ཙ ts	ཆ ch	ཚ tsh		ཝ w
Values	Thai	ะ a	ิ i	ุ u	ด d	-ัว ua	เ- e	ก k	ห h	โ- o	จ ch	ข kh	ล l	ม m	น n	อ ∅	ผ ph	เ-ือ uea	ร r	ส s	ถ th	ค kh	บ b	ฝ f	ย y	-ำ am		ว w
Values	Chinese	¯	b	c	d	ye	f	g, j	h, x	yi	r	k, q	l	m	n	wo	p	ch	er	s	t	wu	an	yang	wai	z		wei

The 1878 congress only succeeded in unifying the basic Latin alphabet. The additional letters of the extended French Braille alphabet, such as ⠯, are not included in the international standard. The French ⠯, for example, corresponds to print ⟨ç⟩, whereas the ⠯ in Unified English Braille transcribes the letter sequence ⟨and⟩, and the ⠯ in Hungarian and Albanian braille is ⟨q⟩.

=== Alphabets limited to grade-1 braille ===
Languages that in print are restricted to the letters of the basic Latin script are generally encoded in braille using just the 26 letters of grade-1 braille with their French/English values, and often a subset of those letters. Such languages include:

Bemba, Chewa (Nyanja), Dobuan, Greenlandic, Huli, Indonesian, Luvale, Malagasy, Malaysian, Ndebele, Shona, Swahili, Swazi, Tok Pisin, Tolai (Kuanua), Xhosa, Zulu.

In these languages, print digraphs such as ch are written as digraphs in braille too.

Languages of the Philippines are augmented with the use of the accent point with n, ⠈⠝, for ñ. These are Tagalog, Ilocano, Cebuano, Hiligaynon, and Bicol; Ethnologue reports a few others.

Languages of Zambia distinguish ñ/ŋ/ng’ [ŋ] from ng [ŋɡ] with an apostrophe, as in Swahili Braille: ⠝⠛⠄ ng’ vs ⠝⠛ ng. These are Lozi, Kaonde, Lunda, and Tonga. Ganda (Luganda) may be similar.

Ethnologue 17 reports braille use for Mòoré (in Burkina Faso), Rwanda, Rundi, Zarma (in Niger), and Luba-Sanga, but provides few details.

== Congress of 1929 ==
In 1929 in Paris, the American Foundation for Overseas Blind sponsored a conference on harmonizing braille among languages which use the Latin script, which had diverged in the previous decades.

== Congresses of 1950–1951 ==
When additional letters are needed for a new braille alphabet, several remedies are used.

1. They may be borrowed from an existing alphabet; French–German ⠜ ä, ⠪ ö, and ⠳ ü, for example, are widely used where a language had need of a second a-, o-, or u-vowel. Likewise, the values of English contracted ("Grade 2") ⠡ ch, ⠩ sh, and ⠹ th are widely used for similar sounds in other languages.
2. An otherwise unused letter may be reassigned. For example, Tibetan Braille, which is based on German Braille, reassigns ⠉ c, ⠟ q, ⠭ x, and ⠽ y, which are redundant in German.
3. In the case of diacritics in the print alphabet, a point may be added to the base letter in braille. Latvian Braille, for example, adds dot 6 to indicate a diacritic, at the cost of abandoning several international assignments.
4. New letters may be invented by modifying a similar letter. Modification may be done through moving the letter (thus ⠢ and ⠔ for a second e or i vowel), stretching the letter (again, ⠡ and ⠌ for e- and i-like vowels), or rotating or reflecting it. The latter is quite common, producing such pairs as ⠎ s – ⠱ sh and ⠝ n – ⠫ ny. See Hungarian Braille for an alphabet which has exploited a pattern of mirror images, and Thai Braille for the series ⠧ บ b, ⠯ ป p, ⠏ ผ ph_{1}, ⠹ พ ph_{2}.

A regional UNESCO conference on braille uniformity for southern Asia took place in 1950. This led to a conference with global scope the following year. The 1951 congress found many conflicting braille assignments:

Most Asian and African languages contain more letters or sounds than Roman had equivalents for, [and] they had to find some way of representing them. Most of the designers of Braille spoke English and some of them turned to the contractions of English Braille to find signs which would provide precedents for local letter values ... But beyond these again, many non-European alphabets included letters for which no Braille precedent had been created. Arbitrary signs had to be allotted to them, with the consequence that even throughout these traditional Brailles only limited uniformity was achieved.

The congress recognized the role of English contracted braille in establishing a partial international standard, and recommended that alphabets follow existing conventions as much as possible.

=== Common extended correspondences ===
The following assignments include common secondary vowels and consonants: Whenever a second a- or d-based letter is needed in an alphabet, use of the same secondary braille letter is common. Additional alternative letters are used in some braille alphabets. English grade 2 braille correspondences are given below for recognition; these are often the basis of international usage.

- Vowels
  Letter	Braille	Extended use	Notes
  A	⠁ (braille pattern dots-1)	Arabic alif	
  2nd A	⠜ (braille pattern dots-345)	German Ä Indic Ā Arabic Ā Scandinavian Æ English ar	
  E	⠑ (braille pattern dots-15)		
  2nd E	⠢ (braille pattern dots-26)	Indic Ĕ African Ẹ, Ɛ English en	
  I	⠊ (braille pattern dots-24)		
  2nd I	⠔ (braille pattern dots-35)	Indic Ī African Ị English in	
- Vowels (cont.)
  Letter	Braille	Extended use	Notes
  long I (ai)	⠌ (braille pattern dots-34)	Indic AI	
  O	⠕ (braille pattern dots-135)		
  2nd O	⠪ (braille pattern dots-246)	French Œ German Ö Indic AU; African Ọ, Ɔ English ow	
  U	⠥ (braille pattern dots-136)		
  2nd U	⠳ (braille pattern dots-1256)	German Ü Indic Ū African Ụ English ou	
- Occlusives
  Letter	Braille	Extended use	Notes
  P	⠏ (braille pattern dots-1234)		
  B	⠃ (braille pattern dots-12)		
  T	⠞ (braille pattern dots-2345)		
  2nd T	⠾ (braille pattern dots-23456)	Indic Ṭ Arabic Ṭ English with	
  D	⠙ (braille pattern dots-145)		
  2nd D	⠫ (braille pattern dots-1246)	Indic Ḍ Arabic Ḍ African Ɖ English ed	
  C	⠉ (braille pattern dots-14)		
  CH	⠡ (braille pattern dots-16)	Indic CH; English ch	
- Occlusives (cont.)
  Letter	Braille	Extended use	Notes
  J	⠚ (braille pattern dots-245)		
  K	⠅ (braille pattern dots-13)		
  G	⠛ (braille pattern dots-1245)		
  Q	⠟ (braille pattern dots-12345)	Arabic Q African KW	also Indic KṢ
  apostrophe	⠄ (braille pattern dots-3)	English apostrophe	used for Arabic ء
  M	⠍ (braille pattern dots-134)		
  N	⠝ (braille pattern dots-1345)		
  NG	⠬ (braille pattern dots-346)	African Ŋ Indic Ṅ English ing	
- Fricatives
  Letter	Braille	Extended use	Notes
  F	⠋ (braille pattern dots-124)		
  V	⠧ (braille pattern dots-1236)		
  TH	⠹ (braille pattern dots-1456)	Indic TH; Arabic Θ English th Icelandic Þ	
  DH	⠮ (braille pattern dots-2346)	Indic DH; Arabic/Icelandic Ð English the	
  S	⠎ (braille pattern dots-234)		
  2nd S	⠯ (braille pattern dots-12346)	French Ç Indic Ṣ Arabic Ṣ	English and
  Z	⠵ (braille pattern dots-1356)		
- Fricatives (cont.)
  Letter	Braille	Extended use	Notes
  SH	⠩ (braille pattern dots-146)	Indic Ś Arabic Š, African Ṣ, Ʃ English sh	
  ZH	⠴ (braille pattern dots-356)	Indic JH	English was
  X	⠭ (braille pattern dots-1346)	/x/ or /ks/ Arabic X	
  GH	⠣ (braille pattern dots-126)	Indic GH; African Ɣ Arabic Ɣ English gh	
  H	⠓ (braille pattern dots-125)		
  2nd H	⠱ (braille pattern dots-156)	Arabic Ħ English wh	German SCH; Chinese SH
- Liquids
  Letter	Braille	Extended use	Notes
  L	⠇ (braille pattern dots-123)		
  2nd L	⠸ (braille pattern dots-456)	Indic Ḷ English world	
  R	⠗ (braille pattern dots-1235)		
  2nd R	⠻ (braille pattern dots-12456)	Indic Ṛ or Ṟ English er	African Ẹ / Ɛ
  Y	⠽ (braille pattern dots-13456)		
  W	⠺ (braille pattern dots-2456)		
- Additional consonants
  Letter	Braille	Extended use	Notes
  Dh	⠿ (braille pattern dots-123456)	Indic ḌH; Arabic Ẓ	2nd Dh braille pattern English for
  B	⠆ (braille pattern dots-23)	African Ɓ, GB; English bb	2nd B braille pattern
  K	⠨ (braille pattern dots-46)	African Ƙ Indic KH; German "ck"	2nd K braille pattern English ance
  ayin	⠷ (braille pattern dots-12356)	Arabic ʿ French "à"	English of
