= One dot (diacritic) =

Diacritical mark

◌̇ ◌̣o

Dot
- U+0307 ◌̇ COMBINING DOT ABOVE; U+0323 ◌̣ COMBINING DOT BELOW

When used as a diacritic mark, the term dot primarily refers to the glyphs "combining dot above" (◌̇), and "combining dot below" (◌̣) which may be combined with some letters of the extended Latin alphabets in use in a variety of languages. Similar marks are used with other scripts.

== Overdot ==
Language scripts or transcription schemes that use the dot above a letter as a diacritical mark:

- In some forms of Arabic romanization, ġ stands for ghayn (غ).
- The Latin orthography for Chechen includes ċ, ç̇, ġ, q̇ and ẋ, corresponding to Cyrillic цӏ, чӏ, гӏ, къ and хь and representing /t͡sʼ/, /t͡ʃʼ/, /ɣ/, /qʼ/ and /ħ/ respectively.
- Traditional Irish typography, where the dot denotes lenition, and is called a ponc séimhithe or buailte "dot of lenition": ḃ ċ ḋ ḟ ġ ṁ ṗ ṡ ṫ. Alternatively, lenition may be represented by a following letter h, thus: bh ch dh fh gh mh ph sh th. In Old Irish orthography, the dot was used only for ḟ ṡ, while the following h was used for ch ph th; lenition of other letters was not indicated. Later the two systems spread to the entire set of lenitable consonants and competed with each other. Eventually the standard practice was to use the dot when writing in Gaelic script and the following h when writing in antiqua. Thus ċ and ch represent the same phonetic element in Modern Irish.
- Lithuanian: ė is pronounced as [eː], as opposed to ę, which is pronounced a lower [æː] (formerly nasalised), or e, pronounced [ɛ, æː].
- Livonian uses ȯ for one of its eight vowels, pronounced /ɤ/.
- Maltese: ċ is used for a voiceless palato-alveolar affricate, ġ for a voiced palato-alveolar affricate, and ż for a voiced alveolar sibilant.
- Old English: In modernized orthography, ċ is used for a voiceless palato-alveolar affricate /t͡ʃ/, ġ for a palatal approximant /j/ (probably a voiced palatal fricative /ʝ/ in the earliest texts), and (more rarely) sċ for a voiceless palato-alveolar fricative /ʃ/ and cġ for a voiced palato-alveolar affricate /d͡ʒ/.
- Polish: ż is used for a voiced retroflex sibilant /ʐ/.
- The Siouan languages such as Lakota, Osage, and Crow sometimes use the dot above to indicate ejective stops.
- In the Canadian Aboriginal Syllabics orthography for the Cree, Ojibwe, and Inuktitut languages, a dot above a symbol signifies that the symbol's vowel should be a long vowel—the equivalent effect using the Roman orthography is achieved by doubling the vowel (ᒥ = mi, ᒦ = mii), placing a macron over the vowel (ᑲ = ka, ᑳ = kā), or placing a circumflex over the vowel (ᓄ = no, ᓅ = nô).
- In Turkish, the dot above lowercase i and j (and uppercase İ) is not regarded as an independent diacritic but as an integral part of the letter. It is called a tittle. I without an overdot is a separate letter.
- In the Rheinische Dokumenta phonetic writing system overdots denote a special pronunciation of r.
- The Ulithian alphabet includes ȧ, ė, and ȯ.
- The ISO 9 (1968) Romanization of Cyrillic uses ė, ḟ, and ẏ.
- In the ISO 259 Romanization of Hebrew, the overdot is used to transcribe the dagesh: ⟨ḃ ḋ ġ ḣ ṁ ṅ ṙ ṡ ṥ ṧ ṩ ṫ⟩; ⟨ẇ⟩ transcribes the shuruk.
- In IAST and National Library at Calcutta romanization transcribing languages of India, ṅ is used to represent /ŋ/.
- UNGEGN romanization of Urdu includes ṙ.
- In the Venda language, ṅ is used to represent /ŋ/.
- Some countries use the overdot as a decimal mark.
- The overdot is also used in the Devanagari script, where it is called anusvara.

In mathematics and physics, when using Newton's notation the dot denotes the time derivative as in $v=\dot{x}$. In addition, the overdot is one way used to indicate an infinitely repeating set of numbers in decimal notation, as in $0.\dot{3}$, which is equal to the fraction 1/3, and $0.\dot{1}\dot{4}\dot{2}\dot{8}\dot{5}\dot{7}$ or $0.\dot{1}4285\dot{7}$, which is equal to 1/7.

== Underdot ==
- In a number of languages, an underdot indicates a raised or relatively high vowel, often the counterpart of a lower vowel marked with an ogonek or left unmarked.
  - In Rotuman, ạ represents /ɔ/.
  - In Romagnol, ẹ ọ are used to represent [e, o], e.g. part of Riminese dialect fradẹll, ọcc [fraˈdell, ˈotʃː] "brothers, eyes".
  - In academic notation of Old Latin, ẹ̄ (e with underdot and macron) represents the long vowel, probably /eː/, that developed from the early Old Latin diphthong ei. This vowel usually became ī in Classical Latin.
  - In academic transcription of Vulgar Latin, used in describing the development of the Romance languages, ẹ and ọ represent the close-mid vowels /e/ and /o/, in contrast with the open-mid vowels /ɛ/ and /ɔ/, which are represented as e and o with ogonek (ę ǫ).
  - Academic transcription of Middle English uses the same conventions as Vulgar Latin above.
  - In academic transcription of Serbo-Croatian dialects, ẹ ọ ạ (typically /e/ /o/ /ɐ/) represent higher vowels than standard e o a, and the first two often contrast with lower vowels marked with a comma below, e̦ o̦ (typically /ɛ/ /ɔ/).
- In Inari Sami, an underdot denotes a half-long voiced consonant: đ̣, j̣, ḷ, ṃ, ṇ, ṇj, ŋ̣, ṛ, and ṿ. The underdot is used in dictionaries, textbooks, and linguistic publications only.
- In IAST and National Library at Calcutta romanization, transcribing languages of India, a dot below a letter distinguishes the retroflex consonants ṭ, ḍ, ṛ, ḷ, ṇ, ṣ, while m with underdot (ṃ) signifies an anusvara and h with underdot (ḥ) signifies a visarga. Very frequently (in modern transliterations of Sanskrit) an underdot is used instead of the ring (diacritic) below the vocalic r and l.
- In romanizations of some Afroasiatic languages, particularly Semitic Languages and Berber Languages, an underdot indicates an emphatic consonant. The romanization of Arabic uses ⟨ḍ ḥ ṣ ṭ ẓ⟩.
- In the DIN 31636 and ALA-LC Romanization of Hebrew, ṿ represents vav (ו), while v without the underdot represents beth (ב). ḳ represents qoph (ק) while k represents kaph (כ). ḥ represents chet (ח).
- The underdot is also used in the PDA orthography for Domari to show pharyngealization—the underdotted consonants ⟨ḍ ḥ ṣ ṭ ẓ⟩ represent the emphaticized sounds /d̪ˤ ħ sˤ t̪ˤ zˤ/.
- In Asturian, ḷḷ (underdotted double ll) represents the voiced retroflex plosive or the voiceless retroflex affricate, depending on dialect, and ḥ (underdotted h) the voiceless glottal fricative.
- In the O'odham language, Ḍ (d with underdot) represents a voiced retroflex stop.
- In Vietnamese, The nặng tone (low, glottal) is represented with a dot below the base vowel: ạ ặ ậ ẹ ệ ị ọ ộ ợ ụ ự ỵ.
- In Igbo, an underdot can be used on i, o, and u to make ị, ọ, and ụ. The underdot symbolizes a reduction in the vowel height.
- In Yoruba, an underdot can be used on e and o to make ẹ and ọ, symbolizing a reduction in the vowel height, as well as on s to make ṣ, symbolizing a postalveolar articulation.
- In Americanist phonetic notation, x with underdot x̣ represents a voiceless uvular fricative.
- Underdots are used in the Rheinische Dokumenta phonetic writing system to denote a voiced s and special pronunciations of r and a.
- In the Fiero-Rhodes orthography for Eastern Ojibwe and Odaawaa, in g̣, ḥ, and ḳ, underdot is used to indicate labialization when either ⟨o⟩ or ⟨w⟩ following them was lost in syncope.
- The Sicilian nexus ḍḍ is used to represent [ɖɖ].
- In Kalabari, ḅ and ḍ are used.
- In Marshallese, underdots on consonants represent velarization, (Note: The official orthography uses a cedilla on the consonant, like ļ, but dictionaries and other textbooks use an underdot.) such as the velarized lateral ḷ.
- UNGEGN romanization of Urdu includes ḍ, g̣, ḳ, ṭ, ẉ, and ỵ.
- In Mizo, ṭ represents /t͡r/.
- The underdot is also used in the Devanagari script, where it is called nukta.

== Raised dot and middle dot ==
In Canadian Aboriginal Syllabics, in addition to the middle dot as a letter, centred dot diacritic, and dot above diacritic, there also is a two-dot diacritic in the Naskapi language representing /_w_V/ which depending on the placement on the specific Syllabic letter may resemble a colon when placed vertically, diaeresis when placed horizontally, or a combination of middle dot and dot above diacritic when placed either at an angle or enveloping a small raised letter ᓴ. Additionally, in Northwestern Ojibwe, a small raised /wi/ as /w/, the middle dot is raised farther up as either ᣜ or ᣝ; there also is a raised dot "Final" (ᣟ), which represents /w/ in some Swampy Cree and /y/ in some Northwestern Ojibwe.

== Side dot ==
The diacritics 〮 and 〯 , known as Bangjeom (방점; 傍點), were used to mark pitch accents in Hangul for Middle Korean. They were written to the left of a syllable in vertical writing and above a syllable in horizontal writing.

== Dot above right ==
In the Pe̍h-ōe-jī orthography of Hokkien, a dot above right is used in the letter o͘ to represent the vowel /ɔ/.

== Letters with dot ==
- Dot ◌̇ ◌̣
  Latin: Ȧ ȧ Ǡ ǡ
- Ạ ạ Ậ ậ
- Ặ ặ
- Ḃ ḃ Ḅ ḅ
- Ċ ċ C̣ c̣
- Ç̇ ç̇ Ć̣ ć̣
- Č̣ č̣ Ꜿ ꜿ
- Ḋ ḋ Ḍ ḍ
- Ė ė Ė́ ė́
- Ė̃ ė̃ Ẹ ẹ
- Ệ ệ
- Ḟ ḟ F̣ f̣
- Ġ ġ G̣ g̣
- Ḣ ḣ Ḥ ḥ
- İ
- i̇̀ i̇́ i̇̃ į̇́ į̇̃
- Ị ị
- J̣ j̣
- K̇ k̇ Ḳ ḳ
- L̇ l̇ Ḷ ḷ
- Ḹ ḹ Ŀ ŀ
- Ṁ ṁ Ṃ ṃ
- Ṅ ṅ Ṇ ṇ
- Ȯ ȯ O͘ o͘
- Ọ ọ Ộ ộ
- Ȱ ȱ Ợ ợ
- Ṗ ṗ P̣ p̣
- Q̇ q̇ Q̣ q̣
- Q̣̇ q̣̇ Q̣̈ q̣̈
- Ṙ ṙ Ṛ ṛ
- Ṝ ṝ Ṡ ṡ
- ẛ Ṡ̃ ṡ̃
- Ṣ ṣ Ṥ ṥ
- Ṧ ṧ Ṩ ṩ
- Ṫ ṫ Ṭ ṭ
- U̇ u̇ U̇̄ u̇̄
- Ụ ụ Ự ự
- V̇ v̇ Ṿ ṿ
- Ẇ ẇ Ẉ ẉ
- Ẋ ẋ X̣ x̣
- Ẏ ẏ Ỵ ỵ
- Ż ż Ẓ ẓ

== Encoding ==
In Unicode, the dot is encoded as a combining diacritic at:

- U+0307 ◌̇ COMBINING DOT ABOVE

and at:

- U+0323 ◌̣ COMBINING DOT BELOW
- U+0358 ◌͘ COMBINING DOT ABOVE RIGHT
- U+1DF8 ◌᷸ COMBINING DOT ABOVE LEFT

There is also:

- U+02D9 ˙ DOT ABOVE (&DiacriticalDot;, &dot;)
- U+18DF ᣟ CANADIAN SYLLABICS FINAL RAISED DOT

The many precomposed characters can be found at the Unicode Consortium website.

== See also ==
- Anunaasika – Diacritic in Indic scripts
- Chandrabindu – Diacritic mark typically denoting nazalization, in Indian abugidas
- Emphasis mark – East Asian typographical markings
- Interpunct – Typographical symbol (·)
- Tittle – Diacritical mark, the dot of the letters i and j
- Two dots (diacritic) – Diacritic that consists of two dots placed over a letter
  - diaeresis (diacritic) – Mark that indicates separation of vowels
  - umlaut (diacritic) – Diacritic mark to indicate sound shift
- Arabic alphabet
- Hebrew diacritics
- Dot (disambiguation)
- Two dots (disambiguation)
- Three dots (disambiguation)
