= Ring (diacritic) =

Diacritic sign

◌̊ ◌̥o

Ring

A ring diacritic may appear above or below letters. It may be combined with some letters in various extended Latin alphabets either as a distinct letter or to indicate a modified pronunciation of the base letter.

== Rings ==
=== Distinct letter ===
The character Å (å) is derived from an A with a ring. It is a distinct letter in the Danish, Norwegian, Swedish, Finnish, Walloon, and Chamorro alphabets. For example, the 29-letter Swedish alphabet begins with the basic 26 Latin letters and ends with the three letters Å, Ä, and Ö.

=== Overring ===
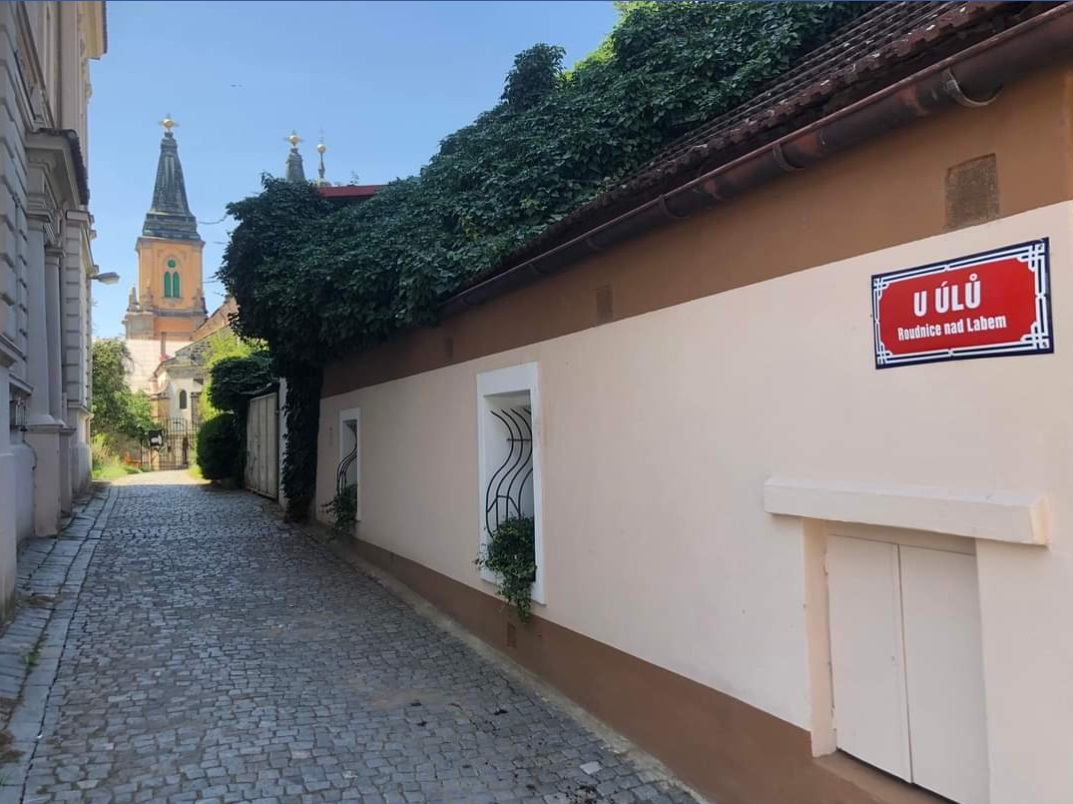
Street name U Úlů ("At the beehives") in Roudnice nad Labem in the Czech Republic

The character Ů (ů), a Latin U with overring, or kroužek, is a grapheme in Czech preserved for historic reasons, and represented a vowel shift. For example, the word for "horse" used to be written kóň, which evolved, along with pronunciation, into kuoň. Ultimately, the vowel [o] disappeared completely, and the uo evolved into ů, modern form kůň. The letter ů now has the same pronunciation as the letter ú (long [uː]), but changes to a short o when a word is morphed (e.g. nom. kůň → gen. koně, nom. dům → gen. domu), thus showing the historical evolution of the language. Ů can occur in only the medial or final positions, while ú occurs almost exclusively in initial position or at the beginning of a word root in a compound. The characters are used also in Steuer's Silesian alphabet. The [uo] pronunciation has prevailed in some Moravian dialects, as well as in Slovak, which uses the letter ô instead of ů.

The ring is used in some dialects of Emilian and Romagnol to distinguish the sound /ʌ/ (å) from /a/ (a).

ů was used in Old Lithuanian in Lithuania Minor from the 16th till the beginning of the 20th century and for a shorter time in 16th-century Lithuania Major for diphthong [uo].

The ring was used in the Lithuanian Cyrillic alphabet promoted by Russian authorities in the last quarter of the 19th century with the letter У̊ / у̊ used to represent the /wɔ/ diphthong (now written uo in Lithuanian orthography).

ẘ and ẙ are used in the ISO 233 romanization of the Arabic alphabet. A fatḥah followed by the letter ⟨ﻭ⟩ (wāw) with a sukūn (ـَوْ) is romanized as aẘ. A fatḥah followed by the letter ⟨ﻱ⟩ (yā’) with a sukūn over it (ـَيْ) is romanized as aẙ.

Ring upon e (e̊) is used by certain dialectologists of Walloon (especially Jean-Jacques Gaziaux) to note the /ə/ vowel, which typically replaces /i/ and /y/ in the Brabant Province's central Walloon dialects. The difficulty of typewriting it has led some writers to prefer ⟨ë⟩ for the same sound.

=== Underring ===
The underring is used in IPA to indicate voicelessness and in Indo-European studies or in Sanskrit transliteration (ISO 15919) to indicate syllabicity of sonorants.

==== Pashto ====
In the romanization of Pashto, ⟨ḁ⟩ is used to represent /ə/.

=== Half rings ===
Half rings also exist as diacritic marks: the characters U+0351 ◌͑ COMBINING LEFT HALF RING ABOVE and U+0357 ◌͗ COMBINING RIGHT HALF RING ABOVE. These characters are used in the Uralic Phonetic Alphabet, respectively for mediopalatal pronunciation and strong-onset vowels. The characters may be used in the International Phonetic Alphabet to denote less and more roundedness, respectively, as alternatives to half rings below U+031C ◌̜ COMBINING LEFT HALF RING BELOW and U+0339 ◌̹ COMBINING RIGHT HALF RING BELOW. They are here given with the lowercase a: a͑ and a͗, a̜ and a̹.

U+1E9A ẚ LATIN SMALL LETTER A WITH RIGHT HALF RING is similar in appearance but differs from a͗ because its compatibility decomposition uses U+02BE ʾ MODIFIER LETTER RIGHT HALF RING instead of U+0357 ◌͗ COMBINING RIGHT HALF RING ABOVE.

Other, similar, signs are in use in Armenian: the U+0559 ◌ՙ ARMENIAN MODIFIER LETTER LEFT HALF RING and the U+055A ◌՚ ARMENIAN APOSTROPHE.

Breve and inverted breve are also shaped like half rings, respectively, the bottom and the top half of a circle.

=== Other uses ===
The ring is used in the transliteration of Abkhaz to represent the letter ҩ. It may also be used in place of the abbreviation symbol ॰ when transliterating the Devanagari alphabet.

== Unicode ==
Many more characters can be created in Unicode using the combining character U+030A ◌̊ COMBINING RING ABOVE, including the above-mentioned у̊ (Cyrillic у with overring) and e̊ (e with overring).

The standalone (spacing) symbol is U+02DA ˚ RING ABOVE. The unrelated but nearly identical degree symbol is U+00B0 ° DEGREE SIGN.

Although similar in appearance, it is not to be confused with the Japanese handakuten (U+309A ◌゚ COMBINING KATAKANA-HIRAGANA SEMI-VOICED SOUND MARK), a diacritic used with the kana for syllables starting with h to indicate that they should instead be pronounced with [p]. In Japanese dialectology, handakuten is used with kana for syllables starting with k to indicate their consonant is [ŋ], with syllables starting with r to indicate their consonant is l though this does not change the pronunciation, with kana u to indicate its morph into kana n, and with kana i to indicate the vowel is to be said as [ɨ].

In Canadian Aboriginal Syllabics, there are two ring characters: ᐤ (Cree and Ojibwe final w, or Sayisi o) and ᣞ (Cree and Ojibwe final w or final y). The second, smaller, ring can combine as a diacritic ring above in Moose Cree and Moose-Cree-influenced Ojibwe as a final y. In Inuktitut, the ring above the /_i/ character turns it into a /_aai/ character. In Western Cree syllabics, /_w_w/ sequence is represented as ᐝ.

In addition to the combining character option, Unicode has some precomposed characters:

- U+00C5 Å LATIN CAPITAL LETTER A WITH RING ABOVE
- U+00E5 å LATIN SMALL LETTER A WITH RING ABOVE
- U+016E Ů LATIN CAPITAL LETTER U WITH RING ABOVE
- U+016F ů LATIN SMALL LETTER U WITH RING ABOVE
- U+01FA Ǻ LATIN CAPITAL LETTER A WITH RING ABOVE AND ACUTE
- U+01FB ǻ LATIN SMALL LETTER A WITH RING ABOVE AND ACUTE
- U+1E98 ẘ LATIN SMALL LETTER W WITH RING ABOVE
- U+1E99 ẙ LATIN SMALL LETTER Y WITH RING ABOVE
- U+212B Å ANGSTROM SIGN
- U+1402 ᐂ CANADIAN SYLLABICS AAI
- U+1430 ᐰ CANADIAN SYLLABICS PAAI
- U+144D ᑍ CANADIAN SYLLABICS TAAI
- U+146C ᑬ CANADIAN SYLLABICS KAAI
- U+148A ᒊ CANADIAN SYLLABICS CAAI
- U+14A4 ᒤ CANADIAN SYLLABICS MAAI
- U+14C1 ᓁ CANADIAN SYLLABICS NAAI
- U+14D4 ᓔ CANADIAN SYLLABICS LAAI
- U+14EE ᓮ CANADIAN SYLLABICS SAAI
- U+1527 ᔧ CANADIAN SYLLABICS YAAI
- U+1545 ᕅ CANADIAN SYLLABICS RAAI
- U+1554 ᕔ CANADIAN SYLLABICS FAAI
- U+157E ᕾ CANADIAN SYLLABICS QAAI
- U+158E ᖎ CANADIAN SYLLABICS NGAAI
- U+18B0 ᢰ CANADIAN SYLLABICS OY
- U+18B1 ᢱ CANADIAN SYLLABICS AY
- U+18B2 ᢲ CANADIAN SYLLABICS AAY
- U+18B3 ᢳ CANADIAN SYLLABICS WAY
- U+18B4 ᢴ CANADIAN SYLLABICS POY
- U+18B5 ᢵ CANADIAN SYLLABICS PAY
- U+18B6 ᢶ CANADIAN SYLLABICS PWOY
- U+18B7 ᢷ CANADIAN SYLLABICS TAY
- U+18B8 ᢸ CANADIAN SYLLABICS KAY
- U+18B9 ᢹ CANADIAN SYLLABICS KWAY
- U+18BA ᢺ CANADIAN SYLLABICS MAY
- U+18BB ᢻ CANADIAN SYLLABICS NOY
- U+18BC ᢼ CANADIAN SYLLABICS NAY
- U+18BD ᢽ CANADIAN SYLLABICS LAY
- U+18BE ᢾ CANADIAN SYLLABICS SOY
- U+18BF ᢿ CANADIAN SYLLABICS SAY
- U+18C0 ᣀ CANADIAN SYLLABICS SHOY
- U+18C1 ᣁ CANADIAN SYLLABICS SHAY
- U+18C2 ᣂ CANADIAN SYLLABICS SHWOY
- U+18C3 ᣃ CANADIAN SYLLABICS YOY
- U+18C4 ᣄ CANADIAN SYLLABICS YAY
- U+18C5 ᣅ CANADIAN SYLLABICS RAY

Unicode encodes the underring as a combining character at U+0325 ◌̥ COMBINING RING BELOW. Unicode also has precomposed characters for the letters ⟨A⟩ and ⟨a⟩ with underring (U+1E00 Ḁ LATIN CAPITAL LETTER A WITH RING BELOW and U+1E01 ḁ LATIN SMALL LETTER A WITH RING BELOW). Precomposed character encodings for 'R with ring below', 'L with ring below', 'R with ring below and macron', and 'L with ring below and macron' were proposed, because of their use in Sanskrit transliteration and the CSX+ Indic character set. The proposal was rejected because they are already encoded as combining character sequences.

== Letters with ring ==
- Ring ◌̊ ◌̥ Å å
- Ǻ ǻ
- Å̂ å̂
- Å̃ å̃
- Å̄ å̄
- Å̆ å̆
- Ā̊ ā̊
- Ą̊ ą̊
- Å̱ å̱
- Ḁ ḁ
- Ḁ̂ ḁ̂
- D̊ d̊
- E̊ e̊
- E̊̄ e̊̄
- G̊ g̊
- I̊ i̊
- J̊ j̊
- L̥ l̥
- L̥̄ l̥̄
- O̊ o̊
- Ō̊ ō̊
- Q̊ q̊
- R̥ r̥
- R̥̄ r̥̄
- S̊ s̊
- S̥ s̥
- Ů ů
- Ů́ ů́
- Ů̃ ů̃
- Ũ̊ ũ̊
- Ū̊ ū̊
- V̊ v̊
- W̊ ẘ
- X̊ x̊
- Y̊ ẙ
  Cyrillic: А̊ а̊
- У̊ у̊

== Similar marks ==
The ring as a diacritic mark should not be confused with the dot or U+0366 ◌ͦ COMBINING LATIN SMALL LETTER O diacritic marks, or with the degree sign °.

The half ring as a diacritic mark should not be confused with the comma or ogonek diacritic marks.
