= Sun and moon letters =

Two groups of Arabic consonants

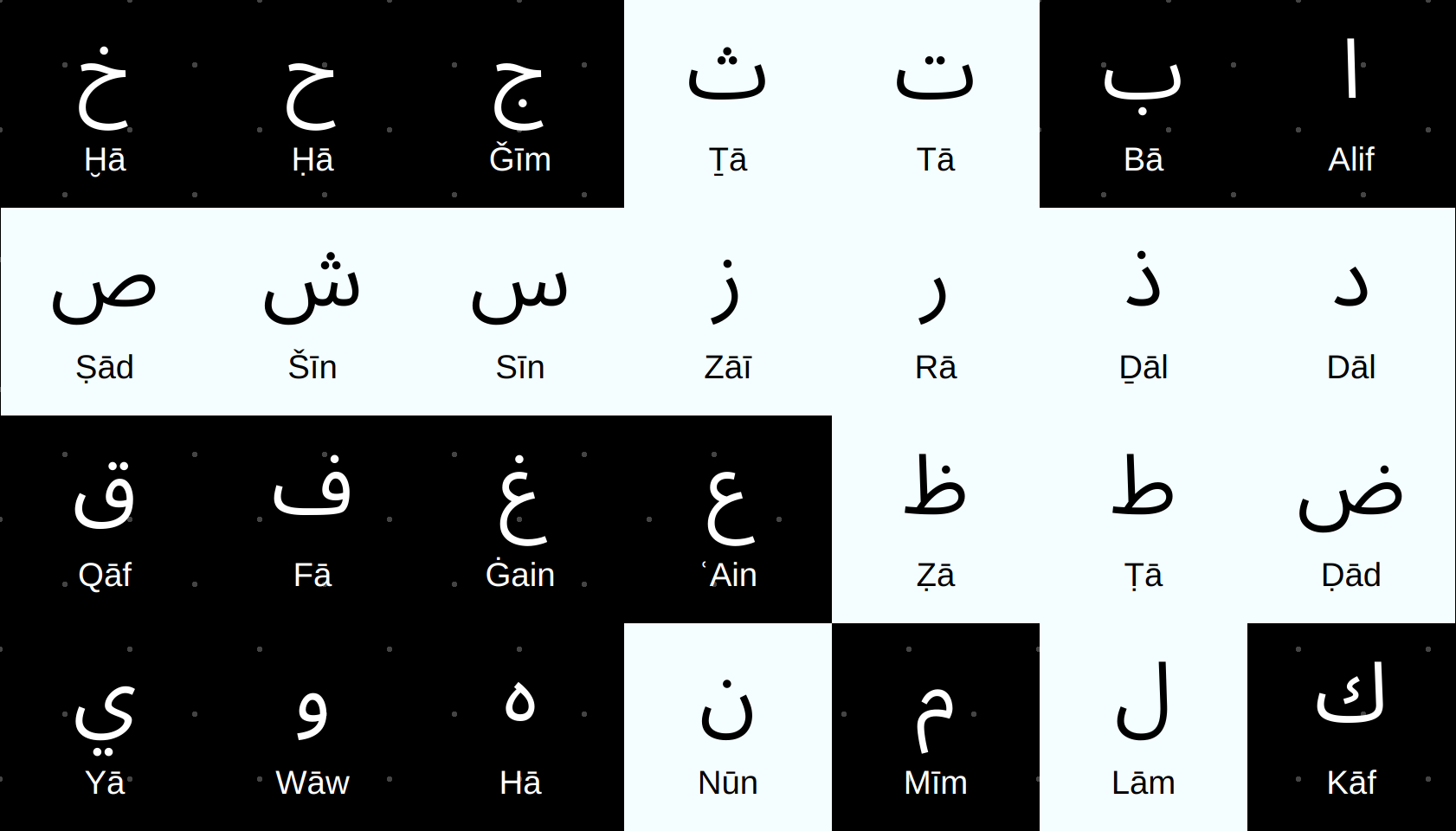
The Arabic Sun consonants in black on white and Moon consonants in white on black

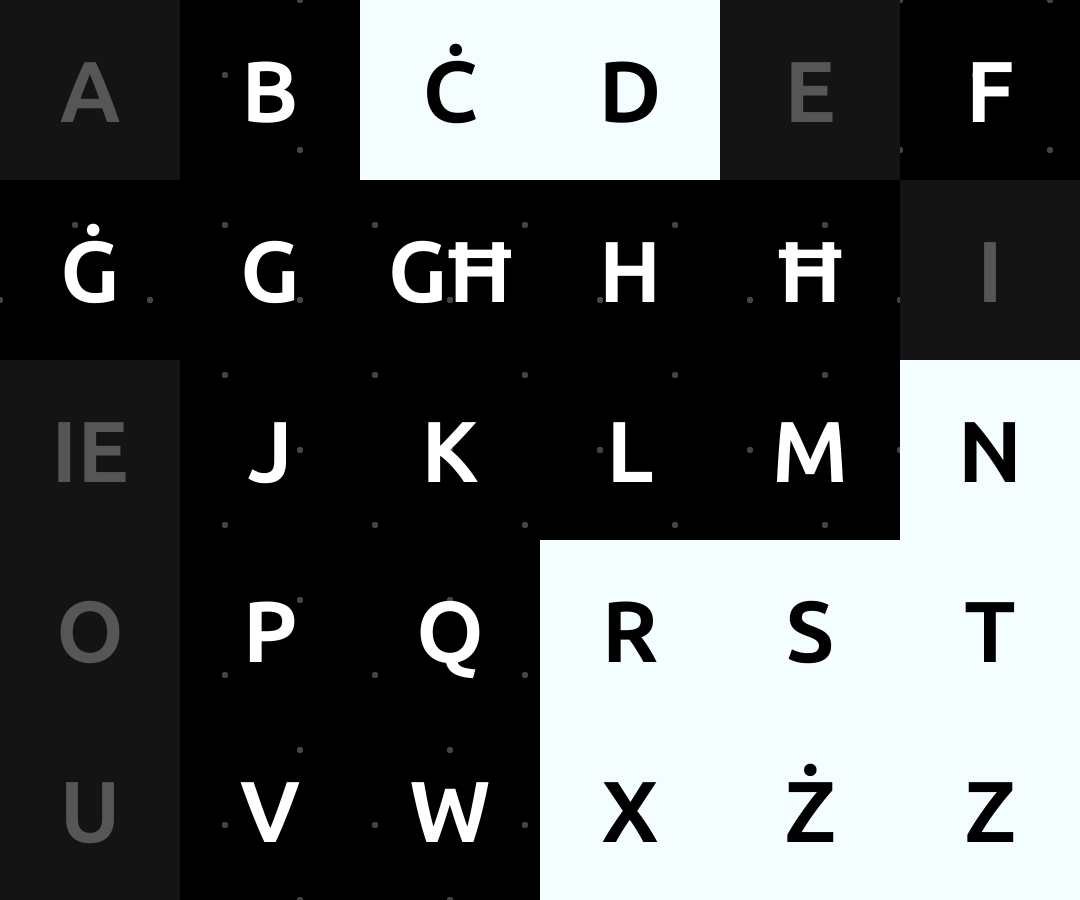
The Maltese moon consonants highlighted in white on black, the sun consonants in black on white, and the vowels in gray

In Arabic and Maltese, all consonants are classified into two distinct groups known as sun letters (Arabic: حروف شمسية ḥurūf shamsiyyah, Maltese: konsonanti xemxin) and moon letters (Arabic: حروف قمرية ḥurūf qamariyyah, Maltese: konsonanti qamrin).

This distinction affects the way the definite article (equivalent to "the" in English) is assimilated or pronounced before consonants: when a word begins with a sun letter, the definite article assimilates with the initial consonant of the word.

The names stem from how the definite article interacts with the nouns "Sun" and "Moon" in Arabic (and Maltese). In Arabic, al-shams ('the Sun') becomes ash-shams (assimilating the lām), while al-qamar ('the Moon') remains unchanged. Similarly, in Maltese, 'the Sun' is ix-xemx (with assimilation), while 'the Moon' is il-qamar (without assimilation).

== Rule ==
When followed by a sun letter, the /l/ of the Arabic definite article al- assimilates to the initial consonant of the following noun, resulting in a doubled consonant. For example, "the Nile" is pronounced an-Nīl, not al-Nīl.

When the Arabic definite article (الْـ) is followed by a moon letter, no assimilation takes place.

The sun letters represent the coronal consonants according to the phonology of Classical Arabic, and the moon letters represent all others. Note that the mnemonic اِبْغِ حَجَّكَ وَخَفْ عَقِيمَهُ (pronounced somewhat like aibgh hajak wakhaf eaqimah) groups all moon letters.

The sun and moon letters are as follows:

Sun letters	ت	ث	د	ذ	ر	ز	س	ش	ص	ض	ط	ظ	ل	ن
Sun letters	t	th	d	dh	r	z	s	sh	ṣ	ḍ	ṭ	ẓ	l	n
Sun letters	/t/	/θ/	/d/	/ð/	/r/	/z/	/s/	/ʃ/	/sˤ/	/dˤ/	/tˤ/	/ðˤ/	/l/	/n/
Moon letters	ا	ب	ج	ح	خ	ع	غ	ف	ق	ك	م	ه	و	ي
Moon letters	ʼ	b	j	ḥ	kh	ʻ	gh	f	q	k	m	h	w	y
Moon letters	/ʔ/	/b/	/d͡ʒ/*	/ħ/	/x/	/ʕ/	/ɣ/	/f/	/q/	/k/	/m/	/h/	/w/	/j/

=== Jīm ===
The letter ج jīm is pronounced differently depending on the region of the speaker. In many regions it represents a coronal consonant such as [d͡ʒ] or [ʒ]. However, in Classical Arabic, it represented a palatalized voiced velar plosive /ɡʲ/ or a voiced palatal plosive /ɟ/. A contemporary pronunciation as [ɡ] is retained in Egypt, Oman, and coastal Yemen or [ɟ] in eastern hinterland Yemen, and as a variant in Sudan. As a result, it was classified as a moon letter, and it does not assimilate the article in Classical Arabic. Maltese ġ /d͡ʒ/ is also considered a moon consonant, whereas its voiceless counterpart ċ /t͡ʃ/ is a sun consonant.

However, in some varieties of Moroccan, Mesopotamian, and Palestinian Arabic, jīm (often /ʒ/) assimilates, like a sun letter, e.g., ij-jamal 'camel'.

=== Emphatic consonants ===
In Arabic dialects, like Palestinian, al before an emphatic consonant only assimilates in place of articulation but not in pharyngealization, hence it-ṭāwla instead of aṭ-ṭāwila (الطاولة 'table').

== Maltese ==
The sun (konsonanti xemxin) and moon (konsonanti qamrin) letters are as follows:

Sun letters	ċ	d	l	n	r	s	t	x	ż	z				
Sun letters	/t͡ʃ/	/d/	/l/	/n/	/r/	/s/	/t/	/ʃ/, /ʒ/	/z/	/t͡s/, /d͡z/				
Moon letters	b	f	ġ	g	għ	h	ħ	j	k	m	p	q	v	w
Moon letters	/b/	/f/	/d͡ʒ/	/g/	/ˤː/	silent	/h/,/ħ/	/j/	/k/	/m/	/p/	/ʔ/	/v/	/w/

If a word starts with any of the moon letters, the definite article il- stays the same and does not assimilate, while with the sun letters it assimilates accordingly to: iċ-, id-, in-, ir-, is-, it-, ix-, iż-, iz-. It is also worth mentioning that words starting with vowels, and the letters għ, and h get the definite article l- (minus the initial i). When the definite article comes exactly after a word ending in a vowel, the initial <i> of the article always drops, as in "dak ir-raġel ra r-raġel" (that man saw the man). When a word starts with two consonants, the definite article used is l-, but an i is attached at the beginning of the word: skola > l-iskola and Żvezja > l-Iżvezja.

The sound /l/ (represented by the letters L and ل) function in the same way regardless of if it is a sun or moon letter, e.g. (the meat) is il-laħam in Maltese and الْلَحْمْ al-laḥm in Arabic or (the game) is il-logħba in Maltese and الْلُعْبَة al-luʿba in Arabic.

== Orthography ==
In the written language, the ⟨ال⟩ al is retained regardless of how it is pronounced. When full diacritics are used, assimilation may be expressed by putting a shaddah ⟨ ّ⟩ on the consonant after the lām ⟨ل⟩. Non-assimilation may be expressed by placing a sukūn over the lām ⟨لْ⟩.

Most modern-written Arabic names (including personal names and geographical Arabic names) do not follow the consonant assimilation rule or the shaddah when Latinized in Latin-spelled languages. Sometimes the sun and moon rules are not followed in casual speech. They are also mostly spaced rather than hyphenated.

E.g. personal name:

- الرَّحْمَن - Al Rahman or El Rahman instead of Ar-Raḥmān

transliterated geographical name:

- الْجُمْهُورِيَّةُ التُّونِسِيَّة - Al Jumhuriyah Al Tunisiyah instead of al-Jumhūrīyatu t-Tūnisīyah

Examples
Sun letters			Moon letters		
الشَّمْس	ash-shams	'the sun'	الْقَمَر	al-qamar	'the moon'
الثِّقَة	ath-thiqah	'the confidence'	الْمُرْجَان	al-murjān	'the coral'

Moon/Lunar Letters حروف قمرية ḥurūf qamarīyah
Letter	IPA	/l/ in the definite article "al" remains	Examples
ء ʼ	/ʔ/	الْإ, الْأ al-’a.../ al-’u...; al-’i...	الْأَخُ al-ʼakh(u) = the brother الْأُذُنُ al-’udhun(u) = the ear الْإِبْرِيقُ al-’ibrīq(u) = the jug
ب b	/b/	الْبـ al-b...	الْبَيتُ al-bayt(u) = the house
ج j	/d͡ʒ/, /ʒ/, /ɟ/, /ɡ/	الْجـ al-j...	الْجَوزُ al-jawz(u) = the walnut
ح ḥ	/ħ/	الْحـ al-ḥ...	الْحَجُّ al-Ḥajj(u) /alˈħad.d͡ʒu, alˈħaʒ.ʒu, alˈħaɟ.ɟu, alˈħaɡ.ɡu/ = the pilgrimage
خ kh	/x/	الْخـ al-kh...	الْخَوْخُ al-khawkh(u) = the peach
ع ʻ	/ʕ/	الْعـ al-ʻ...	الْعَقْلُ al-‘aql(u) = the mind الْعُشْبُ al-‘ush·b(u) = the grass الْعِيدُ al-‘id(u) = the holiday, festival
غ gh	/ɣ/	الْغـ al-gh...	الْغَرَامُ al-gharām(u) = the love, romance, passion
ف f	/f/	الْفـ al-f...	الْفِكْرُ al-fik·r(u) = the thought
ق q	/q/	الْقـ al-q...	الْقِرْدُ al-qird(u) = the monkey
ك k	/k/	الْكـ al-k...	الْكَوْكَبُ al-kawkab(u) = the planet
م m	/m/	الْمـ al-m...	الْمَتْحَفُ al-mat·ḥaf(u) = the museum
و w	/w/	الْو al-w...	الْوَفِيَُ al-wafiy(u) = the faithful = the color
ي y	/j/	الْيـ al-y...	الْيَانْسُونُ al-yānsūn(u) = the anise
ه h	/h/	الْهـ al-h...	الْهَوَاءُ al-hawāʼ(u) = the air

Sun/Solar Letters حروف شمسية ḥurūf shamsīyah
Letter	IPA	/l/ in the definite article "al" assimilates, the following consonant geminates (الْـّ)	Examples
ت t	/t/	التّـ at-t...	التِّينُ at-tīn(u) = the fig
ث th	/θ/	الثّـ ath-th...	الثَّعْلَبُ ath-tha‘lab(u) = the fox
د d	/d/	الدّ ad-d...	الدُّبُّ ad-dubb(u) = the bear
ذ dh	/ð/	الذّ adh-dh...	الذَّكَرُ adh-dhakar(u) = the male
ر r	/r/	−الرّ ar-r...	الرَّبُّ ar-Rabb(u) = the Lord
ز z	/z/	الزّ az-z...	الزَّنْبَقُ az-zanbaq(u) = the lily
س s	/s/	السّـ as-s...	السَّمَاوَاتُ as-samāwāt(u) = the Heavens, firmament, skies
ش sh	/ʃ/	الشّـ ash-sh...	الشَّرْقُ ash-shar·q(u) = the east
ص ṣ	/sˤ/	الصّـ aṣ-ṣ...	الصَّحْرَاءُ aṣ-ṣaḥ·rāʼ(u) = the desert
ض ḍ	/dˤ/	الضّـ aḍ-ḍ...	الضَّبَابُ aḍ-ḍabāb(u) = the fog
ط ṭ	/tˤ/	الطّـ aṭ-ṭ...	الطَّاهِرُ aṭ-ṭāhir(u) = the pure
ظ ẓ	/ðˤ/	الظّـ aẓ-ẓ...	الظُّهْرُ aẓ-ẓuh·r(u) = the noon
ن n	/n/	النّـ an-n...	النِّسَاءُ an-nisā(u) = the women
ل l	/l/	الْلـ al-l...	اللَّوْنُ al-lawn(u) = the color

== See also ==
- Arabic phonology
- Arabic grammar
