= U with ring above (Cyrillic) =

Cyrillic letter used for /ɵ~ʊː/ in Shughni

- У̊ у̊

Usage
- Writing system: Cyrillic
- Type: Alphabetic
- Sound values: /ɵ~ʊː/

U with ring above (У̊ у̊) is a letter of the Cyrillic script, used in the Shughni language and formerly in 19th-century Lithuanian Cyrillic.

== Uses ==
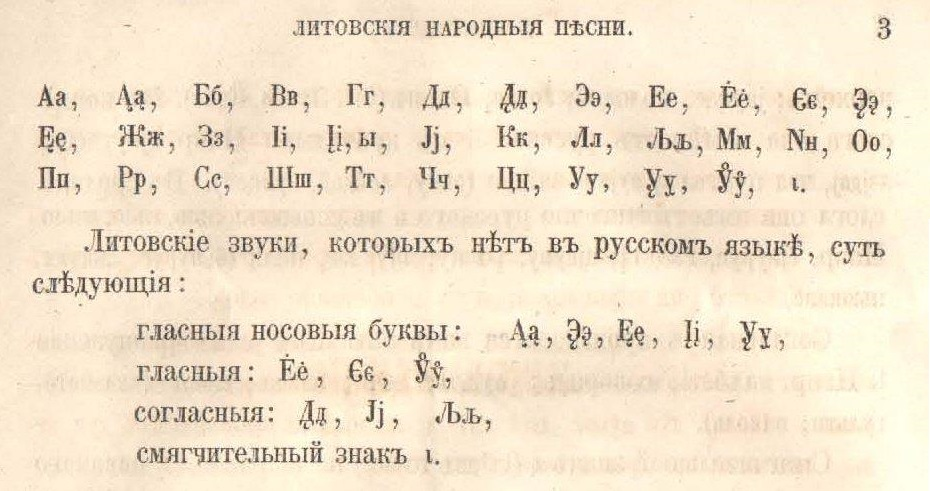
The 1867 Lithuanian Cyrillic alphabet, with this letter

It is the 32nd letter of the Shughni alphabet between ӯ and Ф, representing /ɵ~ʊː/. Sometimes the digraph уо is used instead.

U with ring above was also used in Lithuanian writing, notably in the orthography of Jonas Juška, after the defeat in the January Uprising of 1863 and the following ban on Latin writing in official documents from 1864 to 1904.

== Computing codes ==
This letter is not a precomposed character. It needs to be composed using U+0423 У CYRILLIC CAPITAL LETTER U+U+030A ◌̊ COMBINING RING ABOVE and U+0443 у CYRILLIC SMALL LETTER U+U+030A ◌̊ COMBINING RING ABOVE.

Character information
| Preview | У | | у | | ̊ | |
|---|---|---|---|---|---|---|
| Unicode name | CYRILLIC CAPITAL LETTER U | | CYRILLIC SMALL LETTER U | | COMBINING RING ABOVE | |
| Encodings | decimal | hex | dec | hex | dec | hex |
| Unicode | 1059 | U+0423 | 1091 | U+0443 | 778 | U+030A |
| UTF-8 | 208 163 | D0 A3 | 209 131 | D1 83 | 204 138 | CC 8A |
| Numeric character reference | &#1059; | &#x423; | &#1091; | &#x443; | &#778; | &#x30A; |
| Named character reference | &Ucy; | | &ucy; | | | |

== See also ==
- Ů ů : Latin letter U with ring - a Czech letter
