= Latvian Braille =

Braille alphabet of the Latvian language

- Script type: alphabet
- Print basis: Latvian alphabet
- Languages: Latvian

Related scripts
- Parent systems: Braille: Latvian Braille

Latvian Braille is the braille alphabet of the Latvian language.

== Alphabet ==
The alphabet is as follows. It uses international w for v. All Latvian print diacritics are indicated by dot 6 in Latvian Braille; the international forms of u, v, and z have been abandoned to allow this to be a regular rule (compared to say Lithuanian Braille, which has a separate convention for such letters).

a	ā	b	c	č	d	e	ē	f	g	ģ
h	i	ī	j	k	ķ	l	ļ	m	n	ņ
o	p	r	s	š	t	u	ū	v	z	ž

== Punctuation ==
Print	,	.	?	!	;	:	'	« ... »	( ... )	-	—	/	/
Braille	⠂ (braille pattern dots-2)	⠲ (braille pattern dots-256)	⠢ (braille pattern dots-26)	⠖ (braille pattern dots-235)	⠆ (braille pattern dots-23)	⠒ (braille pattern dots-25)	⠄ (braille pattern dots-3)	...	...	⠤ (braille pattern dots-36)	⠀ (braille pattern blank) ⠤ (braille pattern dots-36)	⠸ (braille pattern dots-456) ⠇ (braille pattern dots-123)	⠌ (braille pattern dots-34)

== Formatting ==
⠼ (braille pattern dots-3456)	⠨ (braille pattern dots-46)	⠠ (braille pattern dots-6)
(digit)	(caps)	(l.c.)
