= DIN 31636 =

German standard for the Romanization of Hebrew

- Last output: 2018
- ISO: ISO 259

DIN 31636 is the German standard for the Romanization of Hebrew. It was published in April 1982 based on the 1899 Instructions for the Alphabetical Catalogues of the Prussian Libraries.

== Transliteration table ==
The romanization of Hebrew into Latin characters is defined as follows:

DIN 31636
| Hebrew | א | ב/בּ | ג | ד | ה | ו | ז | ח | ט | י | כ,ך/כּ | ל | ם מ | ן/נ | ס | ע | פ,ף/פּ | ץ/צ | ק | ר | שׂ | שׁ | ת/תּ | ָ | ַ | ֶ | ֵ | ִ | וֹ | וּ | יַ | יֵ | יִ | ְ | ֲ | ֱ | ֳ | או | אוי/וי | אי | איי/יי | איי/יי |
| Latin | ʾ | v/b | g | d | h | ṿ | z | ḥ | ṭ | y | kh/k | l | m | n | s | ʿ | f/p | ts | ḳ | r | ś | sh | t | a | a/o | e | e | i | o | u | ai | e | i | (e) | a | e | o | | | | | |
| Yiddish | a/o | b | g | d | h | u | z | ḥ | ṭ | i | kh/k | l | m | n | s | e | f/p | ts | ḳ | r | ś | sh | s | | | | | | | | | | | | | | | u | oy | i | ay | ey |

== See also ==
- DIN 31635
