= Ṅ =

Latin letter N with dot above

N with dot above
- Ṅ ṅ

Usage
- Writing system: Latin script
- Type: Alphabetic
- Language of origin: Venda language, Emilian-Romagnol language
- Sound values: [ŋ]
- In Unicode: U+1E44, U+1E45
- Alphabetical position: 16

History
Development
I10
          - Ν ν
            - 𐌍
              - N
                - Ṅ ṅ
- Time period: ~1000 to present
- Sisters: Ñ, N̈, Ŋ, Ꞑ
- Transliterations: Ҥ, ङ, ঙ, ਙ, ઙ, ଙ, ங, ఙ, ಙ, ങ, ඞ

Other
- Writing direction: Left-to-Right

Ṅ (lowercase ṅ) is a letter of the Latin alphabet, formed by N with the addition of a dot above.

The letter is used in Venda and Emilian-Romagnol for the voiced velar nasal (IPA: ŋ), corresponding to the pronunciation of the English digraph "ng" in final position.

Furthermore, the letter is used in some transliteration systems of South Asian languages. The letter is used in the International Alphabet of Sanskrit Transliteration for the "ng" sound corresponding to the Indian letters ङ / ঙ / ਙ / ઙ / ଙ / ங / ఙ / ಙ / ങ / ඞ. The letter is also used in the ISO 9 transliteration of the Cyrillic letter Ҥ.

== Usage in various languages ==
=== Emilian ===
Ṅ is used in Emilian to represent [ŋ], e.g. faréṅna [faˈreŋːna] "flour".

=== Romagnol ===
In Romagnol the use of letter Ṅ is limited to linguistics to represent [ŋ].

=== Balinese ===
In Balinese, "ṅ" is used to represent [ŋ].

== Computer display ==
Character information
Preview	Ṅ		ṅ	
Unicode name	LATIN CAPITAL LETTER N WITH DOT ABOVE		LATIN SMALL LETTER N WITH DOT ABOVE	
Encodings	decimal	hex	dec	hex
Unicode	7748	U+1E44	7749	U+1E45
UTF-8	225 185 132	E1 B9 84	225 185 133	E1 B9 85
Numeric character reference	&#7748;	&#x1E44;	&#7749;	&#x1E45;

Unicode contains the ḀӀ with the code points U+1E46 (uppercase) and U+1E47 (lowercase).

In TeX one can type the ḀӀ with the commands \°.A or \°.a.
