= Ṛ =

Latin letter R with dot below

Latin R with dot below

Ṛ (minuscule: ṛ) is a letter of the Latin alphabet, formed from R with the addition of a dot below the letter. It is used in the transliteration of Afro-Asiatic languages to represent an emphatic r. It is used in transliterating Indo-Aryan and East Iranian languages to represent either syllabic r or a retroflex flap.

In the International Alphabet of Sanskrit Transliteration (IAST) used for Sanskrit and related languages, ṛ represents a syllabic r (ऋ). In transliterations of modern Indo-Aryan languages using ISO 15919 or similar schemes, ṛ represents a retroflex flap, /ɽ/ (ड़).

Superscript Ṛ was widely used in 19th and early 20th century English, particularly on gravestones, in abbreviations of month and personal names such as in NOV^{Ṛ} (November), DEC^{Ṛ} (December), and ALEX^{Ṛ} (Alexander).

== Encoding ==
In Unicode, the code points are within the Latin Extended Additional block:

- U+1E5A Ṛ LATIN CAPITAL LETTER R WITH DOT BELOW
- U+1E5B ṛ LATIN SMALL LETTER R WITH DOT BELOW
