= Ḥ =

Latin letter H with dot below

H with dot below
- Ḥ ḥ

Usage
- Writing system: Latin script
- Type: alphabetic
- Sound values: [ħ] [h] [χ]

History
- Transliterations: ح

Ḥ (minuscule: ḥ) is a letter of the Latin alphabet, formed from H with the addition of a dot below the letter.

== Usage ==
=== Afroasiatic ===
Ḥ is used to represent the voiceless pharyngeal fricative (/ħ/) in Arabic, some Syriac languages (e.g., Turoyo and Sureth), and some forms of the Hebrew language. That said, Modern Israeli Hebrew and Ashkenazi Hebrew—though not strictly—have generally replaced the pronunciation of Ḥ, the eighth letter (ḥet) of the Semitic abjads, with a voiceless uvular fricative (/χ/). It was also used in ancient Egyptian. This sound also exists in Tigrinya, Somali, and Modern South Arabian languages, as well as in a handful of other Afro-Asiatic languages.

=== Asturian ===
Ḥ is used in the Asturian language to represent a voiceless glottal fricative (/h/) sound in words such as "ḥou" and "ḥue", as well as some place names in the eastern part of Asturias (e.g., Ḥontoria and Villaḥormes).

=== Sanskrit ===
Ḥ represents visarga, the phone [h] in Sanskrit phonology in the International Alphabet of Sanskrit Transliteration. Other transliteration systems use different symbols.

== See also ==
- Dot (diacritic)
- H (disambiguation)
- Heth
