= Macron below =

Diacritical mark

◌̱o

Macron below
- U+0331 ◌̱ COMBINING MACRON BELOW

A̱a̱ḆḇC̱c̱

Macron below is a combining diacritical mark that is used in various orthographies.

A non-combining form is U+02CD ˍ MODIFIER LETTER LOW MACRON. It is not to be confused with U+0320 ◌̠ COMBINING MINUS SIGN BELOW, U+0332 ◌̲ COMBINING LOW LINE and U+005F _ LOW LINE. The difference between "macron below" and "low line" is that the latter results in an unbroken underline when it is run together: compare a̱ḇc̱ and a̲b̲c̲ (only the latter should look like abc).

== Unicode ==
=== Macron below character ===
Unicode defines several characters for the macron below:

macron below
combining			spacing		
character	Unicode	HTML	character	Unicode	HTML
◌̱ single	U+0331	&#817;	ˍ letter	U+02CD	&#717;
◌͟◌ double	U+035F	&#863;			

There are many similar marks covered elsewhere:

- Spacing underscores, including
  - U+005F _ LOW LINE (&lowbar;, &UnderBar;)
  - U+2017 ‗ DOUBLE LOW LINE
- Combining underlines, including
  - U+0332 ◌̲ COMBINING LOW LINE
  - U+0333 ◌̳ COMBINING DOUBLE LOW LINE
  - U+0347 ◌͇ COMBINING EQUALS SIGN BELOW;
  - U+FE2B ◌︫ COMBINING MACRON LEFT HALF BELOW
  - U+FE2C ◌︬ COMBINING MACRON RIGHT HALF BELOW
  - U+FE2D ◌︭ COMBINING CONJOINING MACRON BELOW
- International Phonetic Alphabet mark for retracted or backed articulation:
  - U+0320 ◌̠ COMBINING MINUS SIGN BELOW
  - U+02D7 ˗ MODIFIER LETTER MINUS SIGN

=== Precomposed characters ===
Various precomposed letters with a macron below are defined in Unicode:

upper case			lower case			notes
letter	Unicode	HTML	letter	Unicode	HTML	notes
Ḇ	U+1E06	&#7686;	ḇ	U+1E07	&#7687;	Used in the transliteration of Biblical Hebrew into the Roman alphabet to show the fricative value of the letter beth (ב) representing [v], or perhaps [β].
Ḏ	U+1E0E	&#7694;	ḏ	U+1E0F	&#7695;	Used in the transliteration of Biblical Hebrew, Syriac and Arabic into the Roman alphabet to show the fricative value of the letter dalet (ד), [ð], and in the romanization of Pashto, it is used sometimes to represent retroflex D. In Dravidian languages' transcription it represents an alveolar /d/.
			ẖ	U+1E96	&#7830;	Sometimes used for Arabic خ ẖāʼ, Hebrew ח heth, Egyptian 𓄡 (ẖ). There is no precomposed upper case equivalent of ẖ so it uses a combining macron below instead: H̱.
Ḵ	U+1E34	&#7732;	ḵ	U+1E35	&#7733;	Used in the transliteration of Biblical Hebrew into the Roman alphabet to show the fricative value of the letter kaph (כ) representing [x]. Used in Tlingit and Haida (among other Pacific Northwest languages) for the voiceless uvular stop [q]. Close to Korean ㄲ kk; closest English "shocking". Used optionally in the K-dialect of Māori in the South Island of New Zealand, where an original ng has merged with k. The ḵ indicates that it corresponds to ng in other dialects. There is no difference in pronunciation between ḵ and k.
Ḻ	U+1E3A	&#7738;	ḻ	U+1E3B	&#7739;	Used in Pitjantjatjara to represent [ɭ]. One possible transliteration of the Dravidian retroflex approximant /ɻ/ as in Tamil letter ழ. Ḻ is used in the Seri language to represent [l], like English l, while unmodified "l" represents [ɬ], like Welsh ll. It is also used in the proposed Unified Alphabet for Mapudungun.
Ṉ	U+1E48	&#7752;	ṉ	U+1E49	&#7753;	Used in Pitjantjatjara to represent [ɳ], and in Saanich to represent both plain and glottalized [ɴ]. In the romanization of Pashto, it is used sometimes to represent retroflex N. In Dravidian languages' transcription it represents an alveolar /n/.
Ṟ	U+1E5E	&#7774;	ṟ	U+1E5F	&#7775;	Used in Pitjantjatjara to represent [ɻ], and sometimes in the romanization of Pashto to represent the retroflex R. In Dravidian languages' transcription it represents an alveolar trill /r/.
Ṯ	U+1E6E	&#7790;	ṯ	U+1E6F	&#7791;	Used in the proposed Unified Alphabet for Mapudungun language representing [t̪]. In the romanization of Pashto, it is used sometimes to represent retroflex T. In Dravidian languages' transcription it represents an alveolar /t/. In the romanization of Arabic this letter is used to transcribe the letter Ṯāʾ.
Ẕ	U+1E94	&#7828;	ẕ	U+1E95	&#7829;	Used in the 1953 Hebrew Academy Romanization of Hebrew to represent tsade (צ).
			₫	U+20AB	&#8363;	Vietnamese đồng.

Note that the Unicode character names of precomposed characters whose decompositions contain U+0331 ◌̱ COMBINING MACRON BELOW use "WITH LINE BELOW" rather than "WITH MACRON BELOW". Thus, U+1E07 ḇ LATIN SMALL LETTER B WITH LINE BELOW decomposes to U+0062 b LATIN SMALL LETTER B and U+0331 ◌̱ COMBINING MACRON BELOW.

The Vietnamese đồng currency sign resembles a lower case d with a stroke and macron below: U+20AB ₫ DONG SIGN but is neither a letter nor decomposable.

== Use ==
In Comanche, voiceless vowels are marked with a macron below (these are ⟨a̱⟩, ⟨e̱⟩, ⟨i̠⟩, ⟨o̱⟩, ⟨u̱⟩, and ⟨ʉ̱⟩).

In Swedish, o̱ is frequently used as a substitute for &, particularly in handwriting and in prose.

== See also ==
- Underscore
- Macron
