= Ḷ =

Latin letter L with dot below

Ḷ, L with dot below

Ḷ (minuscule: ḷ) is a letter of the Latin alphabet, derived from L with a diacritical dot below. It has been used in multiple languages to represent various sounds:

- In Asturian, a digraph (Ḷḷ, lower case: ḷḷ) is used to represent some western dialectal phonemes corresponding to standard ll (representing a palatal lateral approximant [ʎ]). Among this group of dialectal pronunciations, usually called che vaqueira, can manifest as: a voiced retroflex plosive [ɖ], a voiced retroflex affricate [ɖʐ], a voiceless retroflex affricate [ʈʂ] or a voiceless alveolar affricate [t͡s]. Formerly, this group of sounds were represented as lh (in Fernán Coronas's proposed writing system), ts or ŝ. However, this grapheme is used only in dialectal texts and in toponyms of western Asturias. Because of the difficulties of writing it in digital texts, non-diacritical l.l (majuscule: L.l) is also often used.
- In some dialects of the Iñupiaq language, a Eskaleut language, it is used to represent the voiced palatal lateral fricative. It is attested in the Siḷaliñiġmiutun (North Slope) and Malimiutun (Northwest Arctic) dialects. In these Iñupiaq alphabets, the diacritical dot indicates palatalization; a plain l character is the voiced alveolar lateral fricative.
- In the International Alphabet of Sanskrit Transliteration, ḷ is used to represent vocalic /l/.
- It is used to represent a retroflex lateral approximant /ɭ/ in several modern languages of South Asia when using ISO 15919 or similar transliteration schemes.

== Computer encoding ==
HTML characters and Unicode code point numbers:

- Ḷ: &#7734; or &#x1e36; – U+1E36 Ḷ LATIN CAPITAL LETTER L WITH DOT BELOW
- ḷ: &#7735; or &#x1e37; – U+1E37 ḷ LATIN SMALL LETTER L WITH DOT BELOW
