= Macron (diacritic) =

Diacritical mark (◌̄)

◌̄o

Macron
- U+00AF ¯ MACRON; U+0304 ◌̄ COMBINING MACRON

See also
- U+0331 ◌̱ COMBINING MACRON BELOW; U+203E ‾ OVERLINE; U+0305 ◌̅ COMBINING OVERLINE

A macron (/ˈmækrɒn, ˈmeɪ-/ MAK-ron, MAY-) is a diacritical mark: it is a straight bar ¯ placed above a letter, usually a vowel. Its name derives from the Ancient Greek word μακρόν (makrón), meaning 'long', because it was originally used to mark long or heavy syllables in Greco-Roman metrics. It now more often marks a long vowel. In the International Phonetic Alphabet, the macron is used to indicate a mid-tone; the sign for a long vowel is instead a modified triangular colon ⟨ː⟩.

The opposite is the breve ⟨˘⟩, which marks a short or light syllable or a short vowel.

== Uses ==
=== Syllable weight ===
In Greco-Roman metrics and in the description of the metrics of other literatures, the macron was introduced and is still widely used in dictionaries and educational materials to mark a long (heavy) syllable. Even relatively recent classical Greek and Latin dictionaries are still concerned with indicating only the length (weight) of syllables; that is why most still do not indicate the length of vowels in syllables that are otherwise metrically determined. Many textbooks about Ancient Rome and Greece use the macron, even if it was not actually used at that time (an apex was used if vowel length was marked in Latin).

=== Vowel length ===
The following languages or transliteration systems use the macron to mark long vowels:

- Slavicists use the macron to indicate a non-tonic long vowel, or a non-tonic syllabic liquid, such as on a, e, r, or u. Languages with this feature include standard and dialect varieties of Silesian, Serbo-Croatian, Slovene, and Bulgarian.
- Transcriptions of Arabic typically use macrons to indicate long vowels – ا (alif when pronounced /aː/), و (waw, when pronounced /uː/ or /oː/), and ي (ya', when pronounced /iː/ or /eː/). Thus the Arabic word ثلاثة (three) is transliterated ṯalāṯah.
- Transcriptions of Sanskrit typically use a macron over ā, ī, ū, ṝ, and ḹ in order to mark a long vowel (e and o are always long and consequently do not need any macron).
- In Latin, many of the more recent dictionaries and learning materials use the macron as the modern equivalent of the ancient Roman apex to mark long vowels. Any of the six vowel letters (ā, ē, ī, ō, ū, ȳ) can bear it. It is sometimes used in conjunction with the breve, especially to distinguish the short vowels /i/ and /u/ from their semi-vowel counterparts /j/ and /w/, originally, and often to this day, spelt with the same letters. However, the older of these editions are not always explicit on whether they mark long vowels or heavy syllables – a confusion that is even found in some modern learning materials. In addition, most of the newest academic publications use both the macron and the breve sparingly, mainly when vowel length is relevant to the discussion.
- In romanization of classical Greek, the letters η (eta) and ω (omega) are transliterated as ē and ō, representing the long vowels of classical Greek, whereas the short vowels ε (epsilon) and ο (omicron) are transliterated as plain e and o. The other long vowel phonemes do not have dedicated letters in the Greek alphabet, being indicated by digraphs (transliterated likewise as digraphs) or by the letters α, ι, υ – represented as ā, ī, ū. The same three letters are transliterated as plain a, i, u when representing short vowels.
- The Hepburn romanization system of Japanese, for example, tā (たあ) as opposed to ta (た).
- The Syriac language uses macrons to indicate long vowels in its romanized transliteration: ā for /aː/, ē for /eː/, ū for /uː/ and ō for /ɔː/.
- Baltic languages and Baltic-Finnic languages:
  - Latvian. ā, ē, ī, ū are separate letters but are given the same position in collation as a, e, i, u. Ō was also used in Latvian, but it was discarded as of 1946. Some usage remains in Latgalian.
  - Lithuanian. ū is a separate letter but is given the same position in collation as the unaccented u. It marks a long vowel; other long vowels are indicated with an ogonek (which used to indicate nasalization, but it no longer does): ą, ę, į, ų and o being always long in Lithuanian except for some recent loanwords. For the long counterpart of i, y is used.
  - Livonian. ā, ǟ, ē, ī, ō, ȱ, ȭ and ū are separate letters that sort in alphabetical order immediately after a, ä, e, i, o, ȯ, õ, and u, respectively.
  - Samogitian. ā, ē, ė̄, ī, ū and ō are separate letters that sort in alphabetical order immediately after a, e, ė, i, u and o respectively.
- In the Latin-based alphabet for the Kazakh language, the letter ū is used to represent the close back rounded vowel (corresponding to the Cyrillic letter ұ).
- Transcriptions of Nahuatl, the Aztecs' language, spoken in Mexico. When the Spanish conquistadors arrived, they wrote the language in their own alphabet without distinguishing long vowels. Over a century later, in 1645, Horacio Carochi defined macrons to mark long vowels ā, ē, ī and ō, and short vowels with grave (`) accents. This is rare nowadays since many people write Nahuatl without any orthographic sign and with the letters k, s and w, not present in the original alphabet.
- Modern transcriptions of Old English, for long vowels.
- Latin transliteration of Pali and Sanskrit, and in the IAST and ISO 15919 transcriptions of Indo-Aryan and Dravidian languages.
- Polynesian languages:
  - Cook Islands Māori. In Cook Islands Māori, the macron or mākarōna is not commonly used in writing, but is used in references and teaching materials for those learning the language.
  - Hawaiian. The macron is called kahakō, and it indicates vowel length, which changes meaning and the placement of stress.
  - Māori. In modern written Māori, the macron is used to designate long vowels, with the trema mark sometimes used if the macron is unavailable (e.g. "wähine"). The Māori word for macron is tohutō. The term pōtae ("hat") is also used. In the past, writing in Māori either did not distinguish vowel length, or doubled long vowels (e.g. "waahine"), as some iwi dialects still do.
  - Niuean. In Niuean, "popular spelling" does not worry too much about vowel quantity (length), so the macron is primarily used in scholarly study of the language.
  - Tahitian. The use of the macron is comparatively recent in Tahitian. The Fare Vānaʻa or Académie Tahitienne (Tahitian Academy) recommends using the macron, called the tārava, to represent long vowels in written text, especially for scientific or teaching texts and it has widespread acceptance. (In the past, written Tahitian either did not distinguish vowel length, or used multiple other ways).
  - Tongan and Samoan. The macron is called the toloi/fakamamafa or fa'amamafa, respectively. Its usage is similar to that in Māori, including its substitution by a trema. Its usage is not universal in Samoan, but recent academic publications and advanced study textbooks promote its use.
- The macron is used in Fijian language dictionaries, in instructional materials for non-Fijian speakers, and in books and papers on Fijian linguistics. It is not typically used in Fijian publications intended for fluent speakers, where context is usually sufficient for a reader to distinguish between heteronyms.
- Both Cyrillic and Latin transcriptions of Udege.
- The Latin and Cyrillic alphabet transcriptions of the Tsebari dialect of Tsez.
- In western Cree, Sauk, and Saulteaux, the Algonquianist Standard Roman Orthography (SRO) indicates long vowels [aː eː iː oː~uː] either with a circumflex ⟨â ê î ô⟩ or with a macron ⟨ā ē ī ō⟩.

=== Tone ===
The following languages or alphabets use the macron to mark tones:

- In the International Phonetic Alphabet, a macron over a vowel indicates a mid-level tone.
- In Yoruba an optional macron can be used to indicate mid-level tone if it would otherwise be ambiguous.
- In Pinyin, the official Romanization of Mandarin Chinese, macrons over a, e, i, o, u, ü (ā, ē, ī, ō, ū, ǖ) indicate the high level tone of Mandarin Chinese. The alternative to the macron is the number 1 after the syllable (for example, tā = ta1).
- Similarly in the Yale romanization of Cantonese, macrons over a, e, i, o, u, m, n (ā, ē, ī, ō, ū, m̄, n̄) indicate the high level tone of Cantonese. Like Mandarin, the alternative to the macron is the number 1 after the syllable (for example, tā = ta1).
- In Pe̍h-ōe-jī romanization of Hokkien, macrons over a, e, i, m, n, o, o͘, u, (ā, ē, ī, m̄, n̄, ō, ō͘, ū) indicate the mid level tone ("light departing" or 7th tone) of Hokkien.

=== Omission ===
Sometimes the macron marks an omitted n or m, like the tilde, in which context it is referred to as a "nasal suspension":

- In Old English texts a macron above a letter indicates the omission of an m or n that would normally follow that letter.
- In older handwriting such as the German Kurrentschrift, the macron over an a-e-i-o-u or ä-ö-ü stood for an n, or over an m or an n meant that the letter was doubled. This continued into print in English in the sixteenth century, and to some extent in German. Over a u at the end of a word, the macron indicated um as a form of scribal abbreviation.

=== Letter extension ===
In romanizations of Hebrew, the macron below is typically used to mark the begadkefat consonant lenition. However, for typographical reasons a regular macron is used on p and g instead: p̄, ḡ.

The macron is used in the orthography of a number of vernacular languages of the Solomon Islands and Vanuatu, particularly those first transcribed by Anglican missionaries. The macron has no unique value, and is simply used to distinguish between two different phonemes.

Thus, in several languages of the Banks Islands, including Mwotlap, the simple m stands for /m/, but an m with a macron (m̄) is a rounded labial-velar nasal /ŋ͡mʷ/; while the simple n stands for the common alveolar nasal /n/, an n with macron (n̄) represents the velar nasal /ŋ/; the vowel ē stands for a (short) higher /ɪ/ by contrast with plain e /ɛ/; likewise ō /ʊ/ contrasts with plain o /ɔ/.

In Hiw orthography, the consonant r̄ stands for the prestopped velar lateral approximant /ᶢʟ/. In Araki, the same symbol r̄ encodes the alveolar trill /r/ – by contrast with r, which encodes the alveolar flap /ɾ/.

In Bislama (orthography before 1995), Lamenu and Lewo, a macron is used on two letters m̄ p̄. m̄ represents /mʷ/, and p̄ represents /pʷ/. The orthography after 1995 (which has no diacritics) has these written as mw and pw.

In Kokota, ḡ is used for the velar stop /ɡ/, but g without macron is the voiced velar fricative /ɣ/.

In Marshallese, a macron is used on four letters – ā n̄ ō ū – whose pronunciations differ from the unmarked a n o u. Marshallese uses a vertical vowel system with three to four vowel phonemes, but traditionally their allophones have been written out, so vowel letters with macron are used for some of these allophones. Though the standard diacritic involved is a macron, there are no other diacritics used above letters, so in practice other diacritics can and have been used in less polished writing or print, yielding nonstandard letters like ã ñ õ û, depending on displayability of letters in computer fonts.

- The letter ā is pronounced [æ~ɛ], the palatalized allophone of the phoneme /a/.
- The letter n̄ represents the velar nasal phoneme /ŋ/ and the labialized velar nasal phoneme /ŋʷ/, depending on context. The standard letter does not exist as a precombined glyph in Unicode, so the nonstandard variant ñ is often used in its place.
- The letter ō is pronounced [ʌ] or [ɤ], which are the unrounded velarized allophones of the phonemes /ɜ/ and /ɘ/.
- The letter ū is pronounced [ɯ], the unrounded velarized allophone of the phoneme /ɨ/.

In Obolo, the simple n stands for the common alveolar nasal /n/, while an n with macron (n̄) represents the velar nasal /ŋ/.

=== Other uses ===
- In older German and in the German Kurrent handwriting, as well as older Danish, a macron is used on some consonants, especially n and m, as a short form for a double consonant (for example, n̄ instead of nn).
- A signature of Fyodor Dostoevsky showing a stylized macron above the ⟨т⟩ in "Достоевскій"
  In Russian cursive, as well as in some others based on the Cyrillic script (for example, Bulgarian), a lowercase Т looks like a lowercase m, and a macron is often used to distinguish it from Ш, which looks like a lowercase w (see Т). Some writers also underline the letter ш to reduce ambiguity further.

Also, in some instances, a diacritic will be written like a macron, although it represents another diacritic whose standard form is different:

- In some Finnish, Estonian and Swedish handwriting, a macron-style umlaut is used for ä or ö (also õ and ü in Estonian), sometimes known colloquially as a "lazy man's umlaut". This can also be seen in some modern handwritten German.
- In Norwegian ū, ā, ī, ē and ō can be used for decorative purposes both in handwritten and computed Bokmål and Nynorsk or to denote vowel length such as in dū (you), lā (infinitive form of to let), lēser (present form of "to read") and lūft (air). The diacritic is entirely optional, carries no IPA value and is seldom used in modern Norwegian outside of handwriting.
- In informal Hungarian handwriting, a macron is often a substitute for either a double acute accent or an umlaut (e.g., ö or ő). Because of this ambiguity, using it is often regarded as bad practice.
- In informal handwriting, the Spanish ñ is sometimes written with a macron-shaped tilde: (n̄).

=== Medicine ===
Continuing previous Latin scribal abbreviations, letters with combining macron can be used in various European languages to represent the overlines indicating various medical abbreviations, particularly including:

- ā for ante ("before")
- c̄ for cum ("with")
- p̄ for post ("after")
- q̄ for quisque and its inflections ("every", "each")
- s̄ for sine ("without")
- x̄ for exceptus and its inflections ("except")

Note, however, that abbreviations involving the letter h take their macron halfway up the ascending line rather than at the normal height for unicode macrons and overlines: ħ. This is separately encoded in Unicode with the symbols using bar diacritics and appears shorter than other macrons in many fonts.

=== Mathematics and science ===
The overline is a typographical symbol visually similar to the macron, used in a number of ways in mathematics and science. For example, it is used to represent complex conjugation:

$z = a + bi; \quad \overline{z} = a - bi$

and to represent a line segment in geometry (e.g., $\overline{AB}$), sample means in statistics (e.g., $\overline{X}$) and negations in logic. It is also used in Hermann–Mauguin notation.

=== Music ===
In music, the tenuto marking resembles the macron.

The macron is also used in German lute tablature to distinguish repeating alphabetic characters.

== Letters with macron ==
- Macron ◌̄
  Latin: Ā ā
- Ā́ ā́
- Ā̀ ā̀
- Ā̂ ā̂
- Ā̃ ā̃
- Ǟ ǟ
- Ā̈ ā̈
- Ǡ ǡ
- A̱ a̱
- Å̄ å̄
- Ǣ ǣ
- B̄ b̄
- Ḇ ḇ
- C̄ c̄
- C̱ c̱
- D̄ d̄
- Ḏ ḏ
- Ē ē
- Ḗ ḗ
- Ḕ ḕ
- Ē̂ ē̂
- Ē̃ ē̃
- Ê̄ ê̄
- E̱ e̱
- Ë̄ ë̄
- E̊̄ e̊̄
- F̄ f̄
- Ḡ ḡ
- G̱ g̱
- H̱ ẖ
- Ī ī
- Ī́ ī́
- Ī̀ ī̀
- Ī̂ ī̂
- Ī̃ ī̃
- I̱ i̱
- J̄ j̄
- J̱ j̱
- Ḵ ḵ
- L̄ l̄
- Ḹ ḹ
- Ḻ ḻ
- M̄ m̄
- M̱ m̱
- N̄ n̄
- Ṉ ṉ
- Ō ō
- Ṓ ṓ
- Ṑ ṑ
- Ō̂ ō̂
- Ō̃ ō̃
- Ȫ ȫ
- Ō̈ ō̈
- Ǭ ǭ
- Ȭ ȭ
- Ȱ ȱ
- O̱ o̱
- Ø̄ ø̄
- Œ̄ œ̄
- P̄ p̄
- P̱ p̱
- Q̄ q̄
- R̄ r̄
- Ṟ ṟ
- Ṝ ṝ
- S̄ s̄
- S̱ s̱
- T̄ t̄
- Ṯ ṯ
- Ū ū
- Ū́ ū́
- Ū̀ ū̀
- Ū̂ ū̂
- Ū̃ ū̃
- U̇̄ u̇̄
- Ǖ ǖ
- Ṻ ṻ
- Ṳ̄ ṳ̄
- U̱ u̱
- V̄ v̄
- W̄ w̄
- X̄ x̄
- X̱ x̱
- Ȳ ȳ
- Ȳ́ ȳ́
- Ȳ̀ ȳ̀
- Ȳ̃ ȳ̃
- Y̱ y̱
- Z̄ z̄
- Ẕ ẕ
  Greek: Ᾱ ᾱ
- Ε̄ ε̄
- Ῑ ῑ
- Ῡ ῡ
  Cyrillic: А̄ а̄
- Ӣ ӣ
- Ӯ ӯ

== Technical notes ==
The Unicode Standard encodes two free-standing ("spacing") characters for backwards compatibility, 13 precomposed characters with macron alone, a number of other precomposed characters that have a macron and another diacritic, and two combining diacritic forms that may be used with arbitrary base characters to create further glyphs.

Description	Macrons					
Description	Character	Unicode	HTML	Character	Unicode	HTML
Macron above
Macron above	Combining			Spacing		
Macron above	◌̄ single	U+0304	&#772;	¯ mark	U+00AF	&macr; &#175;
Macron above	◌͞◌ double	U+035E	&#862;	ˉ letter	U+02C9	&#713;
Macron below	(see macron below)					
Additional diacritic	Latin					
Additional diacritic	Upper case			Lower case		
—	Ā	U+0100	&#256;	ā	U+0101	&#257;
—	Ǣ	U+01E2	&#482;	ǣ	U+01E3	&#483;
—	Ē	U+0112	&#274;	ē	U+0113	&#275;
—	Ḡ	U+1E20	&#7712;	ḡ	U+1E21	&#7713;
—	Ī	U+012A	&#298;	ī	U+012B	&#299;
—	Ō	U+014C	&#332;	ō	U+014D	&#333;
—	Ū	U+016A	&#362;	ū	U+016B	&#363;
—	Ȳ	U+0232	&#562;	ȳ	U+0233	&#563;
Diaeresis	Ǟ	U+01DE	&#478;	ǟ	U+01DF	&#479;
Diaeresis	Ȫ	U+022A	&#554;	ȫ	U+022B	&#555;
Diaeresis	Ǖ	U+01D5	&#469;	ǖ	U+01D6	&#470;
Diaeresis	Ṻ	U+1E7A	&#7802;	ṻ	U+1E7B	&#7803;
Dot above	Ǡ	U+01E0	&#480;	ǡ	U+01E1	&#481;
Dot above	Ȱ	U+0230	&#560;	ȱ	U+0231	&#561;
Dot below	Ḹ	U+1E38	&#7736;	ḹ	U+1E39	&#7737;
Dot below	Ṝ	U+1E5C	&#7772;	ṝ	U+1E5D	&#7773;
Ogonek	Ǭ	U+01EC	&#492;	ǭ	U+01ED	&#493;
Tilde	Ȭ	U+022C	&#556;	ȭ	U+022D	&#557;
Acute	Ḗ	U+1E16	&#7702;	ḗ	U+1E17	&#7703;
Acute	Ṓ	U+1E52	&#7762;	ṓ	U+1E53	&#7763;
Grave	Ḕ	U+1E14	&#7700;	ḕ	U+1E15	&#7701;
Grave	Ṑ	U+1E50	&#7760;	ṑ	U+1E51	&#7761;
Cyrillic
—	Ӣ	U+04E2	&#1250;	ӣ	U+04E3	&#1251;
—	Ӯ	U+04EE	&#1262;	ӯ	U+04EF	&#1263;
Greek
—	Ᾱ	U+1FB9	&#8121;	ᾱ	U+1FB1	&#8113;
—	Ῑ	U+1FD9	&#8153;	ῑ	U+1FD1	&#8145;
—	Ῡ	U+1FE9	&#8169;	ῡ	U+1FE1	&#8161;

=== Macron-related Unicode characters not included in the table above ===
- CJK fullwidth variety:
  - U+FFE3 ￣ FULLWIDTH MACRON
- Kazakhstani tenge
  - U+20B8 ₸ TENGE SIGN
- Overlines
- Characters using a macron below instead of above
- Tone contour transcription characters incorporating a macron:
  - U+1DC4 ◌᷄ COMBINING MACRON-ACUTE
  - U+1DC5 ◌᷅ COMBINING GRAVE-MACRON
  - U+1DC6 ◌᷆ COMBINING MACRON-GRAVE
  - U+1DC7 ◌᷇ COMBINING ACUTE-MACRON
- Compound tone diacritics:
  - U+1AD4 ◌᫔ COMBINING VERTICAL-LINE-MACRON
  - U+1AD5 ◌᫕ COMBINING MACRON-VERTICAL-LINE
  - U+1AD8 ◌᫘ COMBINING MACRON-ACUTE-GRAVE
- Two intonation marks historically used by Antanas Baranauskas for Lithuanian dialectology:
  - U+1DCB ◌᷋ COMBINING BREVE-MACRON
  - U+1DCC ◌᷌ COMBINING MACRON-BREVE

== See also ==
- Macron below
- Vinculum (symbol) – Horizontal line used in mathematical notation
- Māori language influence on New Zealand English
