= Ṣ =

Letter of the Latin alphabet

S with dot below
- Ṣ ṣ

Usage
- Writing system: Latin script
- Type: alphabetic
- Sound values: [sˤ] [ʂ] [ʃ]

History
- Transliterations: ص

Ṣ (minuscule: ṣ) is a letter of the Latin alphabet, formed from an S with the addition of a dot below the letter.

== Usage ==
The uses of Ṣ include:

- the romanization of Semitic languages to represent an "emphatic s" /sˤ/, such as the Arabic ص (ṣād) or sometimes the Hebrew צ (tzadi) as pronounced by Mizrahi Jews;
- the romanization of Indic languages to represent retroflex /ʂ/;
- the orthography of Yoruba in Nigeria to represent the voiceless palato-alveolar sibilant /ʃ/ (the English "sh" sound);
- the Alvarez-Hale orthography of the Tohono Oʼodham language for retroflex /ʂ/ (Akimel O'odham and Saxton use ⟨sh⟩ instead).

== Encoding ==
In HTML, these are Ṣ: &#7778; and ṣ: &#7779;. The Unicode codepoints are U+1E62 for Ṣ and U+1E63 for ṣ in Latin Extended Additional range.

== See also ==
- Ṡ
- Tsade
- Dot (diacritic)
