= Ḹ =

Letter "Ḹ" in Indic scripts

Example glyphs
- Bengali–Assamese: ৡ
- Tibetan: ལཱྀ
- Malayalam: ൡ
- Sinhala: ඐ
- Ashoka Brahmi: Ḹ
- Devanagari: ॡ

Cognates
- Hebrew: ל
- Greek: Λ
- Latin: L, Ł, Ɬ
- Cyrillic: Л, Љ, Ԓ, Ӆ

Properties
- Phonemic representation: /l̩ː/
- ISO 15919 transliteration: l̥̄ L̥̄
- IAST transliteration: ḹ Ḹ
- ISCII code point: 00 (0)

Ḹ is a vowel of Indic abugidas. In modern Indic scripts, Ḹ is derived from the early "Ashoka" Brahmi letter. As an Indic vowel, Ḹ comes in two normally distinct forms: 1) as an independent letter, and 2) as a vowel sign for modifying a base consonant. Bare consonants without a modifying vowel sign have the inherent "A" vowel.

== Āryabhaṭa numeration ==
Aryabhata used Devanagari letters for numbers, very similar to the Greek numerals, even after the invention of Indian numerals. The "Ḹ" sign was used to modify a consonant's value ×10^{8}, but the vowel letter did not have an inherent value by itself.

== Historic Ḹ ==
There are three different general early historic scripts - Brahmi and its variants, Kharoṣṭhī, and Tocharian, the so-called slanting Brahmi. Ḹ as found in Brahmi was missing in earlier geometric styles, but emerged during more flowing styles of Brahmi, such as the Kushana and Gupta. In both Tocharian and Kharoṣṭhī, Ḹ is not currently known from any source materials.

=== Brahmi Ḹ ===
The Brahmi letter Ḹ is only found as a vowel mark, and is derived from the consonant La, and therefore is probably from the Aramaic Lamed. This would make it related to the modern Latin L and Greek Lambda. Several identifiable styles of writing the Brahmi Ḹ can be found, most associated with a specific set of inscriptions from an artifact or diverse records from an historic period. As the earliest and most geometric style of Brahmi, the letters found on the Edicts of Ashoka and other records from around that time are normally the reference form for Brahmi letters, but Ḹ must be back-formed from later forms to match the reference geometric writing style, and the reference image for the independent letter is just the vowel mark enlarged to the size of a full letter.

== Devanagari Ḹ ==
Devanagari independent Ḹ and Ḹ vowel sign.

Ḹ (ॡ) is a vowel of the Devanagari abugida. It ultimately arose from the Brahmi letter. Letters that derive from it are the Gujarati letter ૡ, and the Modi letter 𑘉.

=== Devanagari-script languages ===
The Devanagari script is used to write the Hindi language, Sanskrit and the majority of Indo-Aryan languages. In all of these languages, ॡ is a defunct character; indeed, even in Sanskrit, the vowel was added by grammarians only for reasons of symmetry without corresponding usage in the language. Like all Indic scripts, Devanagari vowels come in two forms: an independent vowel form for syllables that begin with a vowel sound, and a vowel sign attached to base consonant to override the inherent /ə/ vowel.

== Bengali Ḹ ==
Bengali independent Ḹ and Ḹ vowel sign.

Ḹ (ৡ) is a vowel of the Bengali abugida. It is derived from the Siddhaṃ letter, and is marked a lack of horizontal head line and less geometric shape than its Devanagari counterpart, ॡ.

=== Bengali-script languages ===
The Bengali script is used to write several languages of eastern India, notably the Bengali language and Assamese. Like all Indic scripts, Bengali vowels come in two forms: an independent vowel form for syllables that begin with a vowel sound, and a vowel sign attached to base consonant to override the inherent /ɔ/ vowel.

== Gujarati Ḹ ==
Gujarati independent Ḹ and Ḹ vowel sign.

Ḹ (ૡ) is a vowel of the Gujarati abugida. It is derived from the Devanagari Ḹ, and ultimately the Brahmi letter.

=== Gujarati-script languages ===
The Gujarati script is used to write the Gujarati and Kutchi languages. Like all Indic scripts, Gujarati vowels come in two forms: an independent vowel form for syllables that begin with a vowel sound, and a vowel sign attached to base consonant to override the inherent /ə/ vowel.

== Telugu Ḹ ==
Telugu independent vowel and vowel sign Ḹ.

Ḹ (ౡ) is a vowel of the Telugu abugida. It ultimately arose from the Brahmi letter Ḹ. It is closely related to the Kannada letter ೡ. Like in other Indic scripts, Telugu vowels have two forms: and independent letter for word and syllable-initial vowel sounds, and a vowel sign for changing the inherent "a" of Telugu consonant letters. Ḹ is a non-attaching vowel sign, and does not alter the underlying consonant or contextually shape itself in any way.

Telugu Ḹ vowel sign on క, ఖ, గ, ఘ & ఙ: Kḹ, Khḹ, Gḹ, Ghḹ and Ngḹ.

== Malayalam Ḹ ==
Malayalam independent vowel and vowel sign Ḹ.

Ḹ (ൡ) is a vowel of the Malayalam abugida. It ultimately arose from the Brahmi letter, via the Grantha letter ḹ. Like in other Indic scripts, Malayalam vowels have two forms: an independent letter for word and syllable-initial vowel sounds, and a vowel sign for changing the inherent "a" of consonant letters. Vowel signs in Malayalam usually sit adjacent to its base consonant - below, to the left, right, or both left and right, but are always pronounced after the consonant sound.

== Odia Ḹ ==
Odia independent vowel and vowel sign Ḹ.

Ḹ (ୡ) is a vowel of the Odia abugida. It ultimately arose from the Brahmi letter, via the Siddhaṃ letter ḹ. Like in other Indic scripts, Odia vowels have two forms: an independent letter for word and syllable-initial vowel sounds, and a vowel sign for changing the inherent "a" of consonant letters. Vowel signs in Odia usually sit adjacent to its base consonant - below, to the left, right, or both left and right, but are always pronounced after the consonant sound. No base consonants are altered in form when adding a vowel sign, and there are no consonant+vowel ligatures in Odia.

== Tirhuta Ḹ ==
Tirhuta independent vowel and vowel sign Ḹ.

Ḹ (𑒊) is a vowel of the Tirhuta abugida. It ultimately arose from the Brahmi letter, via the Siddhaṃ letter ll. Like in other Indic scripts, Tirhuta vowels have two forms: an independent letter for word and syllable-initial vowel sounds, and a vowel sign for changing the inherent "a" of consonant letters. Vowel signs in Tirhuta usually sit adjacent to its base consonant - below, to the left, right, or both left and right, but are always pronounced after the consonant sound. No consonants are altered in form when adding the Ḹ vowel mark, although there are some consonant+vowel ligatures in Tirhuta.

== Comparison of Ḹ ==
The various Indic scripts are generally related to each other through adaptation and borrowing, and as such the glyphs for cognate letters, including Ḹ, are related as well.

Comparison of Ḹ in different scripts

Aramaic
Kharoṣṭhī -	Ashoka Brahmi / 𑁁	Kushana Brahmi (Note: The middle "Kushana" form of Brahmi is a later style that emerged as Brahmi scripts were beginning to proliferate. Gupta Brahmi was definitely a stylistic descendant from Kushana, but other Brahmi-derived scripts may have descended from earlier forms.) 𑀎 / 𑁁	Tocharian (Note: Tocharian is probably derived from the middle period "Kushana" form of Brahmi, although artifacts from that time are not plentiful enough to establish a definite succession.) -
Gupta Brahmi 𑀎 / 𑁁	Pallava -
Kadamba -
Bhaiksuki -	Siddhaṃ	Grantha 𑍡 / 𑍣	Cham -
Sinhala ඐ / ෳ	Pyu / Old Mon (Note: Pyu and Old Mon are probably the precursors of the Burmese script, and may be derived from either the Pallava or Kadamba script) -
Tibetan ལཱྀ / ཹ	Newa 𑐉 / 𑐽	Ahom -	Malayalam ൡ / ൣ
Telugu ౡ / ౣ	Burmese ၕ / ၙ
Lepcha -	Ranjana	Saurashtra ꢋ / ꢽ	Dives Akuru -
Kannada ೡ / ೣ	Kayah Li -
Limbu -	Soyombo (Note: May also be derived from Devangari (see bottom left of table)) -	Khmer ឮ	Tamil -
Chakma -	Tai Tham -
Meitei Mayek -	Gaudi -	Thai ฦๅ	Lao -
Tai Le -
Marchen -	Tirhuta 𑒊 / 𑒸	New Tai Lue -	Tai Viet -	Aksara Kawi 𑼍
'Phags-pa -	Odia ୡ / ୣ	Sharada 𑆌 / 𑆻	Rejang -	Batak -	Buginese -
Zanabazar Square -	Bengali–Assamese ৡ / ৣ	Takri -	Javanese ꦋ	Balinese ᬎ / ᬽ	Makasar -
Hangul (Note: The Origin of Hangul from 'Phags-pa is one of limited influence, inspiring at most a few basic letter shapes. Hangul does not function as an Indic abugida.) -	Northern Nagari -	Dogri -	Laṇḍā -	Sundanese -	Baybayin -
Modi 𑘉 / 𑘸	Gujarati ૡ / ૣ	Khojki -	Khudabadi -	Mahajani -	Tagbanwa -
Devanagari ॡ / ॣ	Nandinagari -	Kaithi -	Gurmukhi -	Multani -	Buhid -
Canadian Syllabics (Note: Although the basic letter forms of the Canadian Aboriginal Syllabics were derived from handwritten Devanagari letters, this abugida indicates vowel sounds by rotations of the letter form, rather than the use of vowel diacritics as is standard in Indic abugidas.) -	Soyombo (Note: May also be derived from Ranjana (see above)) -	Sylheti Nagari -	Gunjala Gondi -	Masaram Gondi (Note: Masaram Gondi acts as an Indic abugida, but its letterforms were not derived from any single precursor script.) -	Hanuno'o -

== Character encodings of Ḹ ==
Most Indic scripts are encoded in the Unicode Standard, and as such the letter Ḹ in those scripts can be represented in plain text with unique codepoint. Ḹ from several modern-use scripts can also be found in legacy encodings, such as ISCII.

Character information
Preview	ॡ		ৡ		ౡ		ୡ		ೡ		ൡ		ૡ	
Unicode name	DEVANAGARI LETTER VOCALIC LL		BENGALI LETTER VOCALIC LL		TELUGU LETTER VOCALIC LL		ORIYA LETTER VOCALIC LL		KANNADA LETTER VOCALIC LL		MALAYALAM LETTER VOCALIC LL		GUJARATI LETTER VOCALIC LL	
Encodings	decimal	hex	dec	hex	dec	hex	dec	hex	dec	hex	dec	hex	dec	hex
Unicode	2401	U+0961	2529	U+09E1	3169	U+0C61	2913	U+0B61	3297	U+0CE1	3425	U+0D61	2785	U+0AE1
UTF-8	224 165 161	E0 A5 A1	224 167 161	E0 A7 A1	224 177 161	E0 B1 A1	224 173 161	E0 AD A1	224 179 161	E0 B3 A1	224 181 161	E0 B5 A1	224 171 161	E0 AB A1
Numeric character reference	&#2401;	&#x961;	&#2529;	&#x9E1;	&#3169;	&#xC61;	&#2913;	&#xB61;	&#3297;	&#xCE1;	&#3425;	&#xD61;	&#2785;	&#xAE1;
ISCII														

Character information
Preview	Ashoka Kushana Gupta				𑍡	
Unicode name	BRAHMI LETTER VOCALIC LL		SIDDHAM LETTER VOCALIC LL		GRANTHA LETTER VOCALIC LL	
Encodings	decimal	hex	dec	hex	dec	hex
Unicode	69646	U+1100E	71049	U+11589	70497	U+11361
UTF-8	240 145 128 142	F0 91 80 8E	240 145 150 137	F0 91 96 89	240 145 141 161	F0 91 8D A1
UTF-16	55300 56334	D804 DC0E	55301 56713	D805 DD89	55300 57185	D804 DF61
Numeric character reference	&#69646;	&#x1100E;	&#71049;	&#x11589;	&#70497;	&#x11361;

Character information
Preview	𑐉		𑆌	
Unicode name	NEWA LETTER VOCALIC LL		SHARADA LETTER VOCALIC LL	
Encodings	decimal	hex	dec	hex
Unicode	70665	U+11409	70028	U+1118C
UTF-8	240 145 144 137	F0 91 90 89	240 145 134 140	F0 91 86 8C
UTF-16	55301 56329	D805 DC09	55300 56716	D804 DD8C
Numeric character reference	&#70665;	&#x11409;	&#70028;	&#x1118C;

Character information
Preview	ၕ	
Unicode name	MYANMAR LETTER VOCALIC LL	
Encodings	decimal	hex
Unicode	4181	U+1055
UTF-8	225 129 149	E1 81 95
Numeric character reference	&#4181;	&#x1055;

Character information
Preview	ឮ	
Unicode name	KHMER INDEPENDENT VOWEL LYY	
Encodings	decimal	hex
Unicode	6062	U+17AE
UTF-8	225 158 174	E1 9E AE
Numeric character reference	&#6062;	&#x17AE;

Character information
Preview	ඐ		ꢋ	
Unicode name	SINHALA LETTER ILUUYANNA		SAURASHTRA LETTER VOCALIC LL	
Encodings	decimal	hex	dec	hex
Unicode	3472	U+0D90	43147	U+A88B
UTF-8	224 182 144	E0 B6 90	234 162 139	EA A2 8B
Numeric character reference	&#3472;	&#xD90;	&#43147;	&#xA88B;

Character information
Preview	𑘉	
Unicode name	MODI LETTER VOCALIC LL	
Encodings	decimal	hex
Unicode	71177	U+11609
UTF-8	240 145 152 137	F0 91 98 89
UTF-16	55301 56841	D805 DE09
Numeric character reference	&#71177;	&#x11609;

Character information
Preview	𑒊	
Unicode name	TIRHUTA LETTER VOCALIC LL	
Encodings	decimal	hex
Unicode	70794	U+1148A
UTF-8	240 145 146 138	F0 91 92 8A
UTF-16	55301 56458	D805 DC8A
Numeric character reference	&#70794;	&#x1148A;

Character information
Preview	ᬎ		ꦋ	
Unicode name	BALINESE LETTER LA LENGA TEDUNG		JAVANESE LETTER NGA LELET RASWADI	
Encodings	decimal	hex	dec	hex
Unicode	6926	U+1B0E	43403	U+A98B
UTF-8	225 172 142	E1 AC 8E	234 166 139	EA A6 8B
Numeric character reference	&#6926;	&#x1B0E;	&#43403;	&#xA98B;
