= Ṭ =

Latin letter T with dot below

T with dot below
- Ṭ ṭ

Usage
- Writing system: Latin script
- Type: alphabetic
- Sound values: [ʈ] [tˤ] [θ]

History
- Transliterations: ٹ

Ṭ (minuscule: ṭ) is a letter of the Latin alphabet, formed from T with the addition of a dot below the letter.

It is used in the orthography of the Mizo, Hakha Chin, Falam Chin and Hmar language and is pronounced like a 'tr' or 'ch' as in 'cheese' or 'change'. Although the Mizo language has both a separate 't' and 'r' in its alphabet, they are not used in the combination 'tr' and a Ṭ or ṭ is used instead.

It is used in the transcription of Afro-Asiatic languages to represent an "emphatic t", in romanization of Arabic and Syriac, and in the Berber Latin alphabets. In the transcription of Arabic, it corresponds to the letter ṭāʾ (ط). It is also used in the Bhojpuri language as a single consonant to represent 'tr'.

In transliterating Indo-Aryan, East Iranian and Dravidian languages it represents a retroflex t. It was also formerly used for the same sound in Javanese, but has now been replaced by the digraph "th". It is used in writing the letters ṭ and ṭh of Pali, an important language in Theravada Buddhism. It is also used for literature in the Chin language. It is after T in the alphabets, as it is pronounced differently from T.

In modern discussion of Early Old French (9th-11th centuries), it represents a voiceless dental fricative, [θ], a sound that disappeared by the time of late 12th-century Old French as reflected in new spellings. Examples: il aimeṭ "he loves" (present indicative, later il aime), aiméṭ "loved" (past participle, later aimé).

== Encoding ==
Character information
Preview	Ṭ		ṭ	
Unicode name	LATIN CAPITAL LETTER T WITH DOT BELOW		LATIN SMALL LETTER T WITH DOT BELOW	
Encodings	decimal	hex	dec	hex
Unicode	7788	U+1E6C	7789	U+1E6D
UTF-8	225 185 172	E1 B9 AC	225 185 173	E1 B9 AD
Numeric character reference	&#7788;	&#x1E6C;	&#7789;	&#x1E6D;

== See also ==
- Teth
