= Ṝ =

Letter "Ṝ" in Indic scripts

Example glyphs
- Bengali–Assamese: ৠ
- Tibetan: རཱྀ
- Malayalam: ൠ
- Sinhala: ඎ
- Ashoka Brahmi: Ṝ
- Devanagari: ॠ

Cognates
- Hebrew: ר
- Greek: Ρ
- Latin: R
- Cyrillic: Р

Properties
- Phonemic representation: /ɻ̩ː/
- ISO 15919 transliteration: r̥̄ R̥̄
- IAST transliteration: ṝ Ṝ
- ISCII code point: 00 (0)

Ṝ is a vowel-like letter of Indic abugidas, often referred to as a "vocalic R̄". In modern Indic scripts, Ṝ is derived from the early "Ashoka" Brahmi letter. As an ostensible Indic vowel, Ṝ comes in two normally distinct forms: 1) as an independent letter, and 2) as a vowel sign for modifying a base consonant. Bare consonants without a modifying vowel sign have the inherent "A" vowel.

== Āryabhaṭa numeration ==
Aryabhata used Devanagari letters for numbers, very similar to the Greek numerals, even after the invention of Indian numerals. The ॄ sign was used to modify a consonant's value ×10^{6}, but the vowel letter ॠ did not have an inherent value by itself.

== Historic Ṝ ==
There are three different general early historic scripts - Brahmi and its variants, Kharoṣṭhī, and Tocharian, the so-called slanting Brahmi. Ṝ was not found as an independent vowel in Brahmi, only as a vowel mark for modifying a base consonant. Like all Brahmic scripts, Tocharian Ṝ has an accompanying vowel mark for modifying a base consonant. In Kharoṣṭhī, the only independent vowel letter is for the inherent A. All other independent vowels, including Ṝ are indicated with vowel marks added to the letter A.

=== Brahmi Ṝ ===
The Brahmi letter Ṝ was a simple modification of the Brahmi Ṛ, and as such is probably ultimately derived from the Aramaic Resh, and is thus related to the modern Latin R and Greek Rho. Several identifiable styles of writing the Ṝ vowel sign can be found, most associated with a specific set of inscriptions from an artifact or diverse records from an historic period. As the earliest and most geometric style of Brahmi, the letters found on the Edicts of Ashoka and other records from around that time are normally the reference form for Brahmi letters, but given the lack of Ṝ vowel signs in early Brahmi, the reference image is normally back-formed to a geometric form of later styles, and the independent letter for Ṝ is derived from the short Ṛ.

=== Tocharian Rii ===
The Tocharian letter is derived from the short Brahmi Ṛ. The Tocharian Ṝ was very infrequently used, and only appears in the corpus in combination with a few base consonants.

Tocharian consonants with Ṝ vowel marks
Kr̄	Khr̄	Gr̄	Ghr̄	Cr̄	Chr̄	Jr̄	Jhr̄	Nyr̄	Ṭr̄	Ṭhr̄	Ḍr̄	Ḍhr̄	Ṇr̄
Tr̄	Thr̄	Dr̄	Dhr̄	Nr̄	Pr̄	Phr̄	Br̄	Bhr̄	Mr̄	Yr̄	r̄r	Lr̄	Vr̄
Śr̄	Ṣr̄	Sr̄	Hr̄										

=== Kharoṣṭhī Ṝ ===
The Kharoṣṭhī letter Ṝ is indicated with the Ṛ vowel mark plus the vowel length mark. As an independent vowel, Ṝ is indicated by adding the vowel marks to the independent vowel letter A.

== Devanagari Ṝ ==
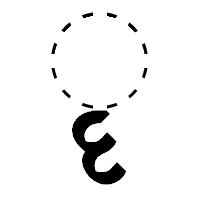
Devanagari independent Ṝ and Ṝ vowel sign.

Ṝ (ॠ) is a vowel of the Devanagari abugida. It ultimately arose from the Brahmi letter. Letters that derive from it are the Gujarati letter ૠ, and the Modi letter 𑘇.

=== Devanagari Using Languages ===
The Devanagari script is used to write the Hindi language, Sanskrit and the majority of Indo-Aryan languages. In most of these languages, ॠ is pronounced as Hindi pronunciation: [riː]. Like all Indic scripts, Devanagari vowels come in two forms: an independent vowel form for syllables that begin with a vowel sound, and a vowel sign attached to base consonant to override the inherent /ə/ vowel.

== Bengali Ṝ ==
Bengali independent Ṝ and Ṝ vowel sign.

Ṝ (ৠ) is a vowel of the Bengali abugida. It is derived from the Siddhaṃ letter, and is marked by the lack of horizontal head line and less geometric shape than its Devanagari counterpart, ॠ.

=== Bengali Script Using Languages ===
The Bengali script is used to write several languages of eastern India, notably the Bengali language and Assamese. In most languages, ৠ is pronounced as [ṝ]. Like all Indic scripts, Bengali vowels come in two forms: an independent vowel form for syllables that begin with a vowel sound, and a vowel sign attached to base consonant to override the inherent /ɔ/ vowel.

== Gujarati Ṝ ==
Gujarati independent Ṝ and Ṝ vowel sign.

Ṝ (ૠ) is a vowel of the Gujarati abugida. It is derived from the Devanagari Ṝ, and ultimately the Brahmi letter.

=== Gujarati-using Languages ===
The Gujarati script is used to write the Gujarati and Kutchi languages. In both languages, ૠ is pronounced as [ṝ]. Like all Indic scripts, Gujarati vowels come in two forms: an independent vowel form for syllables that begin with a vowel sound, and a vowel sign attached to base consonant to override the inherent /ə/ vowel.

== Telugu Ṝ ==
Telugu independent vowel and vowel sign Ṝ.

Ṝ (ౠ) is a vowel of the Telugu abugida. It ultimately arose from the Brahmi letter Ṝ. It is closely related to the Kannada letter ೠ. Like in other Indic scripts, Telugu vowels have two forms: and independent letter for word and syllable-initial vowel sounds, and a vowel sign for changing the inherent "a" of Telugu consonant letters. Ṝ is a non-attaching vowel sign, and does not alter the underlying consonant or contextually shape itself in any way.

Telugu Ṝ vowel sign on క, ఖ, గ, ఘ & ఙ: Kṝ, Khṝ, Gṝ, Ghṝ and Ngṝ.

== Malayalam Ṝ ==
Malayalam independent vowel and vowel sign Ṝ.

Ṝ (ൠ) is a vowel of the Malayalam abugida. It ultimately arose from the Brahmi letter, via the Grantha letter rr. Like in other Indic scripts, Malayalam vowels have two forms: an independent letter for word and syllable-initial vowel sounds, and a vowel sign for changing the inherent "a" of consonant letters. Vowel signs in Malayalam usually sit adjacent to its base consonant - below, to the left, right, or both left and right, but are always pronounced after the consonant sound. Some vowel signs, such as Ṝ, can also form a ligature with some consonants, although this is much more common in old-style paḻaya lipi texts than in the modern reformed paḻaya lipi orthography.

Malayalam Ṝ vowel sign on ക, ഖ, ഗ, ഘ, & ങ: Kṝ, Khṝ, Gṝ, Ghṝ and Ngṝ in paḻaya lipi.

== Odia Ṝ ==
Odia independent vowel and vowel sign Ṝ.

Ṝ (ୠ) is a vowel of the Odia abugida. It ultimately arose from the Brahmi letter, via the Siddhaṃ letter rr. Like in other Indic scripts, Odia vowels have two forms: an independent letter for word and syllable-initial vowel sounds, and a vowel sign for changing the inherent "a" of consonant letters. Vowel signs in Odia usually sit adjacent to its base consonant - below, to the left, right, or both left and right, but are always pronounced after the consonant sound. No base consonants are altered in form when adding a vowel sign, and there are no consonant+vowel ligatures in Odia.

== Tirhuta Ṝ ==
Tirhuta independent vowel and vowel sign Ṝ.

Ṝ (𑒈) is a vowel of the Tirhuta abugida. It ultimately arose from the Brahmi letter, via the Siddhaṃ letter rr. Like in other Indic scripts, Tirhuta vowels have two forms: an independent letter for word and syllable-initial vowel sounds, and a vowel sign for changing the inherent "a" of consonant letters. Vowel signs in Tirhuta usually sit adjacent to its base consonant - below, to the left, right, or both left and right, but are always pronounced after the consonant sound. No consonants are altered in form when adding the Ṝ vowel mark, although there are some consonant+vowel ligatures in Tirhuta.

== Comparison of Ṝ ==
The various Indic scripts are generally related to each other through adaptation and borrowing, and as such the glyphs for cognate letters, including Ṝ, are related as well.

Comparison of Ṝ in different scripts

Aramaic
Kharoṣṭhī -	Ashoka Brahmi / 𑀿	Kushana Brahmi (Note: The middle "Kushana" form of Brahmi is a later style that emerged as Brahmi scripts were beginning to proliferate. Gupta Brahmi was definitely a stylistic descendant from Kushana, but other Brahmi-derived scripts may have descended from earlier forms.) 𑀌 / 𑀿	Tocharian (Note: Tocharian is probably derived from the middle period "Kushana" form of Brahmi, although artifacts from that time are not plentiful enough to establish a definite succession.) -
Gupta Brahmi 𑀌 / 𑀿	Pallava -
Kadamba -
Bhaiksuki 𑰇 / 𑰵	Siddhaṃ / 𑖵	Grantha 𑍠 / 𑍄	Cham -
Sinhala ඎ / ෲ	Pyu / Old Mon (Note: Pyu and Old Mon are probably the precursors of the Burmese script, and may be derived from either the Pallava or Kadamba script) -
Tibetan རཱྀ / ཷ	Newa 𑐇 / 𑐻	Ahom -	Malayalam ൠ / ൄ
Telugu ౠ / ౄ	Burmese ၓ / ၗ
Lepcha -	Ranjana	Saurashtra ꢉ / ꢻ	Dives Akuru -
Kannada ೠ / ೄ	Kayah Li -
Limbu -	Soyombo (Note: May also be derived from Devangari (see bottom left of table)) -	Khmer ឬ	Tamil -
Chakma -	Tai Tham -
Meitei Mayek -	Gaudi -	Thai ฤๅ	Lao -
Tai Le -
Marchen -	Tirhuta 𑒈 / 𑒶	New Tai Lue -	Tai Viet -	Aksara Kawi 𑼋 / 𑼺𑼴
'Phags-pa -	Odia ୠ / ୄ	Sharada 𑆊 / 𑆹	Rejang -	Batak -	Buginese -
Zanabazar Square -	Bengali–Assamese ৠ / ৄ	Takri -	Javanese ꦊ / ꦾ	Balinese ᬌ / ᬻ	Makasar -
Hangul (Note: The Origin of Hangul from 'Phags-pa is one of limited influence, inspiring at most a few basic letter shapes. Hangul does not function as an Indic abugida.) -	Northern Nagari -	Dogri 𑠲	Laṇḍā -	Sundanese ᮼ	Baybayin -
Modi 𑘇 / 𑘶	Gujarati ૠ / ૄ	Khojki -	Khudabadi -	Mahajani -	Tagbanwa -
Devanagari ॠ / ॄ	Nandinagari 𑦧 / 𑧗	Kaithi -	Gurmukhi -	Multani -	Buhid -
Canadian Syllabics (Note: Although the basic letter forms of the Canadian Aboriginal Syllabics were derived from handwritten Devanagari letters, this abugida indicates vowel sounds by rotations of the letter form, rather than the use of vowel diacritics as is standard in Indic abugidas.) -	Soyombo (Note: May also be derived from Ranjana (see above)) -	Sylheti Nagari -	Gunjala Gondi -	Masaram Gondi (Note: Masaram Gondi acts as an Indic abugida, but its letterforms were not derived from any single precursor script.) -	Hanuno'o -

== Character encodings of Ṝ ==
Most Indic scripts are encoded in the Unicode Standard, and as such the letter Ṝ in those scripts can be represented in plain text with unique codepoint. Ṝ from several modern-use scripts can also be found in legacy encodings, such as ISCII.

Character information
Preview					ౠ		ୠ		ೠ		ൠ		ૠ	
Unicode name	DEVANAGARI LETTER VOCALIC RR		BENGALI LETTER VOCALIC RR		TELUGU LETTER VOCALIC RR		ORIYA LETTER VOCALIC RR		KANNADA LETTER VOCALIC RR		MALAYALAM LETTER VOCALIC RR		GUJARATI LETTER VOCALIC RR	
Encodings	decimal	hex	dec	hex	dec	hex	dec	hex	dec	hex	dec	hex	dec	hex
Unicode	2400	U+0960	2528	U+09E0	3168	U+0C60	2912	U+0B60	3296	U+0CE0	3424	U+0D60	2784	U+0AE0
UTF-8	224 165 160	E0 A5 A0	224 167 160	E0 A7 A0	224 177 160	E0 B1 A0	224 173 160	E0 AD A0	224 179 160	E0 B3 A0	224 181 160	E0 B5 A0	224 171 160	E0 AB A0
Numeric character reference	&#2400;	&#x960;	&#2528;	&#x9E0;	&#3168;	&#xC60;	&#2912;	&#xB60;	&#3296;	&#xCE0;	&#3424;	&#xD60;	&#2784;	&#xAE0;
ISCII														

Character information
Preview	Ashoka Kushana Gupta				𑍠	
Unicode name	BRAHMI LETTER VOCALIC RR		SIDDHAM LETTER VOCALIC RR		GRANTHA LETTER VOCALIC RR	
Encodings	decimal	hex	dec	hex	dec	hex
Unicode	69644	U+1100C	71047	U+11587	70496	U+11360
UTF-8	240 145 128 140	F0 91 80 8C	240 145 150 135	F0 91 96 87	240 145 141 160	F0 91 8D A0
UTF-16	55300 56332	D804 DC0C	55301 56711	D805 DD87	55300 57184	D804 DF60
Numeric character reference	&#69644;	&#x1100C;	&#71047;	&#x11587;	&#70496;	&#x11360;

Character information
Preview	𑐇		𑰇		𑆊	
Unicode name	NEWA LETTER VOCALIC RR		BHAIKSUKI LETTER VOCALIC RR		SHARADA LETTER VOCALIC RR	
Encodings	decimal	hex	dec	hex	dec	hex
Unicode	70663	U+11407	72711	U+11C07	70026	U+1118A
UTF-8	240 145 144 135	F0 91 90 87	240 145 176 135	F0 91 B0 87	240 145 134 138	F0 91 86 8A
UTF-16	55301 56327	D805 DC07	55303 56327	D807 DC07	55300 56714	D804 DD8A
Numeric character reference	&#70663;	&#x11407;	&#72711;	&#x11C07;	&#70026;	&#x1118A;

Character information
Preview	ၓ	
Unicode name	MYANMAR LETTER VOCALIC RR	
Encodings	decimal	hex
Unicode	4179	U+1053
UTF-8	225 129 147	E1 81 93
Numeric character reference	&#4179;	&#x1053;

Character information
Preview	ឬ	
Unicode name	KHMER INDEPENDENT VOWEL RYY	
Encodings	decimal	hex
Unicode	6060	U+17AC
UTF-8	225 158 172	E1 9E AC
Numeric character reference	&#6060;	&#x17AC;

Character information
Preview	ඎ		ꢉ	
Unicode name	SINHALA LETTER IRUUYANNA		SAURASHTRA LETTER VOCALIC RR	
Encodings	decimal	hex	dec	hex
Unicode	3470	U+0D8E	43145	U+A889
UTF-8	224 182 142	E0 B6 8E	234 162 137	EA A2 89
Numeric character reference	&#3470;	&#xD8E;	&#43145;	&#xA889;

Character information
Preview	𑘇		𑦧	
Unicode name	MODI LETTER VOCALIC RR		NANDINAGARI LETTER VOCALIC RR	
Encodings	decimal	hex	dec	hex
Unicode	71175	U+11607	72103	U+119A7
UTF-8	240 145 152 135	F0 91 98 87	240 145 166 167	F0 91 A6 A7
UTF-16	55301 56839	D805 DE07	55302 56743	D806 DDA7
Numeric character reference	&#71175;	&#x11607;	&#72103;	&#x119A7;

Character information
Preview	𑒈	
Unicode name	TIRHUTA LETTER VOCALIC RR	
Encodings	decimal	hex
Unicode	70792	U+11488
UTF-8	240 145 146 136	F0 91 92 88
UTF-16	55301 56456	D805 DC88
Numeric character reference	&#70792;	&#x11488;

Character information
Preview	ᬌ	
Unicode name	BALINESE LETTER RA REPA TEDUNG	
Encodings	decimal	hex
Unicode	6924	U+1B0C
UTF-8	225 172 140	E1 AC 8C
Numeric character reference	&#6924;	&#x1B0C;
