= Ḍ =

Latin letter D with dot below

D with dot below
- Ḍ ḍ

Usage
- Writing system: Latin script
- Type: alphabetic
- Sound values: [ɖ] [dˤ] [ð]

History
- Transliterations: ڈ

Ḍ (minuscule: ḍ) is a letter of the Latin alphabet, formed from D with the addition of a dot below the letter.

In the transcription of Afro-Asiatic languages such as Arabic, ⟨ḍ⟩ represents an "emphatic" consonant [dˤ], and is used for that purpose in the Berber Latin alphabet.

In the transcription of Indic and East Iranian languages, and in the orthography of the O'odham and Sicilian languages, ⟨ḍ⟩ represents a retroflex [ɖ]. This was used in a former transcription of Javanese, but has been replaced by ⟨dh⟩.

In modern discussion of Early Old French (9th-11th centuries), it represents a voiced dental fricative, [ð], a sound that disappeared by the time of late 12th-century Old French as reflected in new spellings. Examples: riḍre "to laugh" (later rire), aiméḍe "loved" (feminine singular past participle, later aimée).

== Encoding ==
Character information
Preview	Ḍ		ḍ	
Unicode name	LATIN CAPITAL LETTER D WITH DOT BELOW		LATIN SMALL LETTER D WITH DOT BELOW	
Encodings	decimal	hex	dec	hex
Unicode	7692	U+1E0C	7693	U+1E0D
UTF-8	225 184 140	E1 B8 8C	225 184 141	E1 B8 8D
Numeric character reference	&#7692;	&#x1E0C;	&#7693;	&#x1E0D;

== See also ==
- Ḍād
