= Code page 1101 =

Computer character set for UK English

Code page 1101 (CCSID 1101), also known as CP1101, is an IBM code page number assigned to the UK variant of DEC's National Replacement Character Set (NRCS). The 7-bit character set was introduced for DEC's computer terminal systems, starting with the VT200 series in 1983, but is also used by IBM for their DEC emulation. Similar but not identical to the series of ISO 646 character sets, the character set is a close derivation from ASCII with only code point 0x23 differing.

== Code page layout ==
Code page 1101 (DEC NRCS UK)
	0	1	2	3	4	5	6	7	8	9	A	B	C	D	E	F
0x	NUL	SOH	STX	ETX	EOT	ENQ	ACK	BEL	BS	HT	LF	VT	FF	CR	SO	SI
1x	DLE	DC1	DC2	DC3	DC4	NAK	SYN	ETB	CAN	EM	SUB	ESC	FS	GS	RS	US
2x	SP	!	"	£	$	%	&	'	(	)	*	+	,	-	.	/
3x	0	1	2	3	4	5	6	7	8	9	:	;	<	=	>	?
4x	@	A	B	C	D	E	F	G	H	I	J	K	L	M	N	O
5x	P	Q	R	S	T	U	V	W	X	Y	Z	[	\	]		_
6x	`	a	b	c	d	e	f	g	h	i	j	k	l	m	n	o
7x	p	q	r	s	t	u	v	w	x	y	z	{	|	}	~	DEL

Difference from ASCII

== See also ==
- National Replacement Character Set (NRCS)
- Code page 1013 (similar ISO 646-GB / IR-4 code page)
