= Code page 1103 =

Computer character set for Finnish

Code page 1103 (CCSID 1103), also known as CP1103, or SF7DEC, is an IBM code page number assigned to the Finnish variant of DEC's National Replacement Character Set (NRCS). The 7-bit character set was introduced for DEC's computer terminal systems, starting with the VT200 series in 1983, but is also used by IBM for their DEC emulation. Similar but not identical to the series of ISO 646 character sets, the character set is a close derivation from ASCII with only nine code points differing.

== Code page layout ==
Code page 1103 (DEC NRCS Finnish)
	0	1	2	3	4	5	6	7	8	9	A	B	C	D	E	F
0x	NUL	SOH	STX	ETX	EOT	ENQ	ACK	BEL	BS	HT	LF	VT	FF	CR	SO	SI
1x	DLE	DC1	DC2	DC3	DC4	NAK	SYN	ETB	CAN	EM	SUB	ESC	FS	GS	RS	US
2x	SP	!	"	#	$	%	&	'	(	)	*	+	,	-	.	/
3x	0	1	2	3	4	5	6	7	8	9	:	;	<	=	>	?
4x	@	A	B	C	D	E	F	G	H	I	J	K	L	M	N	O
5x	P	Q	R	S	T	U	V	W	X	Y	Z	Ä	Ö	Å	Ü	_
6x	é	a	b	c	d	e	f	g	h	i	j	k	l	m	n	o
7x	p	q	r	s	t	u	v	w	x	y	z	ä	ö	å	ü	DEL
Differences from ASCII

== See also ==
- Code page 1106 (very similar Swedish code page differing only in one code point)
- Code page 1018 (similar ISO-646-FI / ISO-646-SE / IR-10 code page)
- National Replacement Character Set (NRCS)
