= Code page 1016 =

IBM code page number

Code page 1016 (CCSID 1016), also known as CP1016, is IBM's code page for the Norwegian version of ISO 646.

== Code page layout ==
Code page 1016
| | 0 | 1 | 2 | 3 | 4 | 5 | 6 | 7 | 8 | 9 | A | B | C | D | E | F |
|---|---|---|---|---|---|---|---|---|---|---|---|---|---|---|---|---|
| 0x | NUL | SOH | STX | ETX | EOT | ENQ | ACK | BEL | BS | HT | LF | VT | FF | CR | SO | SI |
| 1x | DLE | DC1 | DC2 | DC3 | DC4 | NAK | SYN | ETB | CAN | EM | SUB | ESC | FS | GS | RS | US |
| 2x | SP | ! | " | # | $ | % | & | ' | ( | ) | * | + | , | - | . | / |
| 3x | 0 | 1 | 2 | 3 | 4 | 5 | 6 | 7 | 8 | 9 | : | ; | < | = | > | ? |
| 4x | @ | A | B | C | D | E | F | G | H | I | J | K | L | M | N | O |
| 5x | P | Q | R | S | T | U | V | W | X | Y | Z | Æ | Ø | Å | | _ |
| 6x | ` | a | b | c | d | e | f | g | h | i | j | k | l | m | n | o |
| 7x | p | q | r | s | t | u | v | w | x | y | z | æ | ø | å | ¯ | DEL |
Differences from ASCII

== See also ==
Code page 1107 (similar DEC-NRCS code page)
