= Windows-1251 =

Windows character set for Cyrillic alphabet

- MIME / IANA: windows-1251
- Alias(es): cp1251 (Code page 1251)
- Languages: Russian, Ukrainian, Belarusian, Bulgarian, Serbian Cyrillic, Bosnian Cyrillic, Macedonian, Rotokas, Rusyn, English
- Created by: Microsoft
- Standard: WHATWG Encoding Standard
- Classification: extended ASCII, Windows-125x
- Other related encodings: Amiga-1251, KZ-1048, RFC 1345's "ECMA-Cyrillic"

Windows-1251 is an 8-bit character encoding, designed to cover languages that use the Cyrillic script such as Russian, Ukrainian, Belarusian, Bulgarian, Serbian Cyrillic, Macedonian and other languages.

On the web, it is the second most-used single-byte character encoding (or third most-used character encoding overall), and most used of the single-byte encodings supporting Cyrillic. As of January 2024, 0.3% of all websites use Windows-1251. It is by far mostly used for Russian, while a small minority of Russian websites use it, with 94.6% of Russian (.ru) websites using UTF-8, and the legacy 8-bit encoding is distant second. In Linux, the encoding is known as cp1251. IBM uses code page 1251 (CCSID 1251 and euro sign extended CCSID 5347) for Windows-1251.

Windows-1251 and KOI8-R (or its Ukrainian variant KOI8-U) are much more commonly used than ISO 8859-5 (which is used by less than 0.0004% of websites). In contrast to Windows-1252 and ISO 8859-1, Windows-1251 is not closely related to ISO 8859-5.

Unicode (e.g. UTF-8) is preferred to Windows-1251 or other Cyrillic encodings in modern applications, especially on the Internet, making UTF-8 the dominant encoding for web pages. (For further discussion of Unicode's complete coverage, of 436 Cyrillic letters/code points, including for Old Cyrillic, and how single-byte character encodings, such as Windows-1251 and KOI8-R, cannot provide this, see Cyrillic script in Unicode.)

== Character set ==
The following table shows Windows-1251. Each character is shown with its Unicode equivalent and its Alt code.

Windows-1251
	0	1	2	3	4	5	6	7	8	9	A	B	C	D	E	F
0x	NUL	SOH	STX	ETX	EOT	ENQ	ACK	BEL	BS	HT	LF	VT	FF	CR	SO	SI
1x	DLE	DC1	DC2	DC3	DC4	NAK	SYN	ETB	CAN	EM	SUB	ESC	FS	GS	RS	US
2x	SP	!	"	#	$	%	&	'	(	)	*	+	,	-	.	/
3x	0	1	2	3	4	5	6	7	8	9	:	;	<	=	>	?
4x	@	A	B	C	D	E	F	G	H	I	J	K	L	M	N	O
5x	P	Q	R	S	T	U	V	W	X	Y	Z	[	\	]		_
6x	`	a	b	c	d	e	f	g	h	i	j	k	l	m	n	o
7x	p	q	r	s	t	u	v	w	x	y	z	{	|	}	~	DEL
8x	Ђ	Ѓ	‚	ѓ	„	…	†	‡	€	‰	Љ	‹	Њ	Ќ	Ћ	Џ
9x	ђ	‘	’	“	”	•	–	—		™	љ	›	њ	ќ	ћ	џ
Ax	NBSP	Ў	ў	Ј	¤	Ґ	¦	§	Ё	©	Є	«	¬	SHY	®	Ї
Bx	°	±	І	і	ґ	µ	¶	·	ё	№	є	»	ј	Ѕ	ѕ	ї
Cx	А	Б	В	Г	Д	Е	Ж	З	И	Й	К	Л	М	Н	О	П
Dx	Р	С	Т	У	Ф	Х	Ц	Ч	Ш	Щ	Ъ	Ы	Ь	Э	Ю	Я
Ex	а	б	в	г	д	е	ж	з	и	й	к	л	м	н	о	п
Fx	р	с	т	у	ф	х	ц	ч	ш	щ	ъ	ы	ь	э	ю	я

Differences from Windows-1252

== Kazakh variants ==
=== KZ-1048 ===
An altered version of Windows-1251 was standardised in Kazakhstan as Kazakh standard STRK1048, and is known by the label KZ-1048. It differs in the rows shown below:

KZ-1048 (STRK1048-2002)
	0	1	2	3	4	5	6	7	8	9	A	B	C	D	E	F
8x	Ђ	Ѓ	‚	ѓ	„	…	†	‡	€	‰	Љ	‹	Њ	Қ	Һ	Џ
9x	ђ	‘	’	“	”	•	–	—		™	љ	›	њ	қ	һ	џ
Ax	NBSP	Ұ	ұ	Ә	¤	Ө	¦	§	Ё	©	Ғ	«	¬	SHY	®	Ү
Bx	°	±	І	і	ө	µ	¶	·	ё	№	ғ	»	ә	Ң	ң	ү

Differences from Windows-1251

=== Code Page 1174 ===
Code Page 1174 is another variant created for the Kazakh language, which matches Windows-1251 for the Russian subset of the Cyrillic letters. It differs from KZ-1048 by moving the Cyrillic letter Shha from 8E/9E to 8A/9A.

Code page 1174
	0	1	2	3	4	5	6	7	8	9	A	B	C	D	E	F
8x	Ђ	Ѓ	‚	ѓ	„	…	†	‡	€	‰	Һ	‹	Њ	Қ	Ћ	Џ
9x	ђ	‘	’	“	”	•	–	—		™	һ	›	њ	қ	ћ	џ
Ax	NBSP	Ұ	ұ	Ә	¤	Ө	¦	§	Ё	©	Ғ	«	¬	SHY	®	Ү
Bx	°	±	І	і	ө	µ	¶	·	ё	№	ғ	»	ә	Ң	ң	ү

Different from Windows-1251

== Latvian variant ==
Windows Latvian + Russian is a modification of Windows-1251 to support the Latvian language. It uses the letter Ō/ō, abolished in 1946 but still used in the Latgalian language while it lacks the letter Ŗ/ŗ.

Windows Latvian + Russian
	0	1	2	3	4	5	6	7	8	9	A	B	C	D	E	F
8x	Ū	Ģ	‚	ō	„	…	†	‡	Ž	‰	Š	‹	Ē	Ķ	Č	ģ
9x	ū	‘	’	“	”	•	–	—	ž	™	š	›	ē	ķ	č	Ō
Ax	NBSP	Ā	ā	Ļ	¤	ļ	¦	§	Ё	©	Ņ	«	¬	SHY	®	¯
Bx	°	±	Ī	ī	´	µ	¶	·	ё	№	ņ	»	¼	½	¾	×

Differences from Windows-1251

== Finnish variant ==
Windows Cyrillic + Finnish is a modification of Windows-1251 that was used by Paratype to cover the Finnish language. This encoding is supported by FontLab Studio 5. This variant is missing the letters Š and Ž which are used in loanwords in Finnish and can be replaced by the digraphs SH and ZH.

Windows Cyrillic + Finnish
	0	1	2	3	4	5	6	7	8	9	A	B	C	D	E	F
8x	Ђ	Ѓ	‚	ѓ	„	…	†	‡	ˆ	‰	Љ	‹	Њ	Ќ	Ћ	Џ
9x	ђ	‘	’	“	”	•	–	—	˜	™	љ	›	њ	ќ	ћ	џ
Ax	NBSP	Ў	ў	Ó	¤	Ґ	¦	§	Ё	©	Ä	«	¬	SHY	®	Ö
Bx	°	±	Å	å	ґ	µ	¶	·	ё	№	ä	»	ó	É	é	ö

Differences from Windows-1251

== Amiga variant ==
Amiga-1251
- MIME / IANA: Amiga-1251
- Alias(es): Ami1251
- Languages: English, Russian
- Classification: extended ASCII
- Based on: Windows-1251, ISO-8859-1, ISO-8859-15

Russian Amiga OS systems used a version of code page 1251 which matches Windows-1251 for the Russian subset of the Cyrillic letters, but otherwise mostly follows ISO-8859-1. This version is known as Amiga-1251, under which name it is registered with the IANA.

Amiga-1251
	0	1	2	3	4	5	6	7	8	9	A	B	C	D	E	F
8x	XXX	XXX	BPH	NBH	IND	NEL	SSA	ESA	HTS	HTJ	VTS	PLD	PLU	RI	SS2	SS3
9x	DCS	PU1	PU2	STS	CCH	MW	SPA	EPA	SOS	XXX	SCI	CSI	ST	OSC	PM	APC
Ax	NBSP	¡	¢	£	€ (Note: Matching ISO-8859-15; at a different location than in Windows-1251)	¥	¦	§	Ё	©	№ (Note: Present in Windows-1251, but in a different location (absent from ISO-8859-1/15))	«	¬	SHY	®	¯
Bx	°	±	²	³	´	µ	¶	·	ё	¹	º	»	¼	½	¾	¿

Different from Windows-1251 to match ISO-8859-1
Different from both Windows-1251 and ISO-8859-1

== See also ==
- Latin script in Unicode
- Cyrillic script in Unicode
- Unicode
- Universal Character Set
  - European Unicode subset (DIN 91379)
- UTF-8
