= Code page 1018 =

Code page for ISO 646

Code page 1018 (CCSID 1018), also known as CP1018, is IBM's code page for the Swedish and Finnish version of ISO 646 (ISO-646-FI / ISO-646-SE / IR-10), specified in SFS 4017 and SEN 850200 Annex B, SIS 63 61 27.

== Code page layout ==
Code page 1018
	0	1	2	3	4	5	6	7	8	9	A	B	C	D	E	F
0x	NUL	SOH	STX	ETX	EOT	ENQ	ACK	BEL	BS	HT	LF	VT	FF	CR	SO	SI
1x	DLE	DC1	DC2	DC3	DC4	NAK	SYN	ETB	CAN	EM	SUB	ESC	FS	GS	RS	US
2x	SP	!	"	#	¤	%	&	'	(	)	*	+	,	-	.	/
3x	0	1	2	3	4	5	6	7	8	9	:	;	<	=	>	?
4x	@	A	B	C	D	E	F	G	H	I	J	K	L	M	N	O
5x	P	Q	R	S	T	U	V	W	X	Y	Z	Ä	Ö	Å		_
6x	`	a	b	c	d	e	f	g	h	i	j	k	l	m	n	o
7x	p	q	r	s	t	u	v	w	x	y	z	ä	ö	å	¯	DEL
Differences from ASCII

== See also ==
- Code page 1103 (similar DEC NRCS code page)
- Code page 1106 (similar DEC NRCS code page)
