= Windows-1253 =

Windows character set for Greek alphabet

- MIME / IANA: windows-1253
- Alias(es): cp1253 (Code page 1253)
- Languages: Greek, English, mathematical usage.
- Created by: Microsoft
- Standard: WHATWG Encoding Standard
- Classification: extended ASCII, Windows-125x
- Based on: ISO/IEC 8859-7, Windows-1252

Windows code page 1253 ("Greek - ANSI"), commonly known by its IANA-registered name Windows-1253 or abbreviated as cp1253, is a Microsoft Windows code page used to write modern Greek. It is not capable of supporting the older polytonic Greek.

It is not fully compatible with ISO 8859-7 because a few characters, including the letter Ά, are located at different byte values:

- µ (Note: This is in addition to the existing μ at 0xEC, which remains in place. Unicode calls the one at 0xB5 "micro sign" (U+00B5) and the one at 0xEC "Greek small letter Mu" (U+03BC), although the former is mapped to the latter by NFKC (although not NFC) Unicode normalization. See also Duplicate characters in Unicode § Duplicate vs. derived character.) and ¶ are added at their locations from Windows-1252 and ISO 8859-1 (0xB5 and 0xB6). This collides with the locations of ΅ and Ά, respectively, in ISO 8859-7.
- ‘ and ’ are moved from their ISO 8859-7 locations (0xA1 and 0xA2) to their Windows-1252 locations (0x91 and 0x92). The displaced ΅ and Ά are moved to the vacated space at 0xA1 and 0xA2 respectively.
- ¤ and ¥ are added at their locations from Windows-1252 and ISO 8859-1 (0xA4 and 0xA5). This collides with additions made to ISO 8859-7 in 2003, when € and ₯ respectively were added to the same locations. The € was added to Windows-1253 at 0x80, the same location which it was added to in Windows-1252. An iota subscript (ͺ) was also added to ISO 8859-7 at 0xAA; this remains unallocated in Windows-1253.
- Several further characters are added at their Windows-1252 locations, although the rest do not collide with ISO 8859-7.

IBM uses code page 1253 (CCSID 1253 and euro sign extended CCSID 5349) for Windows-1253.

Unicode is preferred for Greek in modern applications, especially as UTF-8 encoding on the Internet. Unicode provides many more glyphs for complete coverage, see Greek alphabet in Unicode and Ancient Greek Musical Notation for tables.

== Character set ==
The following table shows Windows-1253. Each character is shown with its Unicode equivalent.

Windows-1253
	0	1	2	3	4	5	6	7	8	9	A	B	C	D	E	F
0x	NUL	SOH	STX	ETX	EOT	ENQ	ACK	BEL	BS	HT	LF	VT	FF	CR	SO	SI
1x	DLE	DC1	DC2	DC3	DC4	NAK	SYN	ETB	CAN	EM	SUB	ESC	FS	GS	RS	US
2x	SP	!	"	#	$	%	&	'	(	)	*	+	,	-	.	/
3x	0	1	2	3	4	5	6	7	8	9	:	;	<	=	>	?
4x	@	A	B	C	D	E	F	G	H	I	J	K	L	M	N	O
5x	P	Q	R	S	T	U	V	W	X	Y	Z	[	\	]		_
6x	`	a	b	c	d	e	f	g	h	i	j	k	l	m	n	o
7x	p	q	r	s	t	u	v	w	x	y	z	{	|	}	~	DEL
8x	€		‚	ƒ	„	…	†	‡		‰		‹				
9x		‘	’	“	”	•	–	—		™		›				
Ax	NBSP	΅	Ά	£	¤	¥	¦	§	¨	©		«	¬	SHY	®	―
Bx	°	±	²	³	΄	µ	¶	·	Έ	Ή	Ί	»	Ό	½	Ύ	Ώ
Cx	ΐ	Α	Β	Γ	Δ	Ε	Ζ	Η	Θ	Ι	Κ	Λ	Μ	Ν	Ξ	Ο
Dx	Π	Ρ		Σ	Τ	Υ	Φ	Χ	Ψ	Ω	Ϊ	Ϋ	ά	έ	ή	ί
Ex	ΰ	α	β	γ	δ	ε	ζ	η	θ	ι	κ	λ	μ	ν	ξ	ο
Fx	π	ρ	ς	σ	τ	υ	φ	χ	ψ	ω	ϊ	ϋ	ό	ύ	ώ	

Differences from ISO 8859-7

== See also ==
- ISO 8859-7
- ISO 5428
