= Code page 1015 =

Computer character set for Portuguese

Code page 1015 (CCSID 1015), also known as CP1015, is IBM's code page for the Portuguese version of ISO 646 for Portugal.

== Code page layout ==
Code page 1015
	0	1	2	3	4	5	6	7	8	9	A	B	C	D	E	F
0x	NUL	SOH	STX	ETX	EOT	ENQ	ACK	BEL	BS	HT	LF	VT	FF	CR	SO	SI
1x	DLE	DC1	DC2	DC3	DC4	NAK	SYN	ETB	CAN	EM	SUB	ESC	FS	GS	RS	US
2x	SP	!	"	#	$	%	&	'	(	)	*	+	,	-	.	/
3x	0	1	2	3	4	5	6	7	8	9	:	;	<	=	>	?
4x	´	A	B	C	D	E	F	G	H	I	J	K	L	M	N	O
5x	P	Q	R	S	T	U	V	W	X	Y	Z	Ã	Ç	Õ		_
6x	`	a	b	c	d	e	f	g	h	i	j	k	l	m	n	o
7x	p	q	r	s	t	u	v	w	x	y	z	ã	ç	õ	~	DEL
Differences from ASCII

== See also ==
- ISO 646
- DEC National Replacement Character Set (NRCS)
