= ELOT 927 =

Character set standardized by ELOT

ELOT 927 is 7-bit character set standardized by ELOT, the Hellenic Organization for Standardization (HOS). It is also known as ISO-IR-88, CSISO88GREEK7 or 7-bit DEC Greek. The standard was withdrawn in November 1986. Support for it was implemented in various dot matrix printers (for example by Fujitsu) and line printers (for example by Printronix and Siemens) as well as in computer terminals (for example by DEC). Support for it can still be found in various applications, languages and protocols today, for example in Perl and Kermit.

== Character set ==
ELOT 927
	0	1	2	3	4	5	6	7	8	9	A	B	C	D	E	F
0x	NUL	SOH	STX	ETX	EOT	ENQ	ACK	BEL	BS	HT	LF	VT	FF	CR	SO	SI
1x	DLE	DC1	DC2	DC3	DC4	NAK	SYN	ETB	CAN	EM	SUB	ESC	FS	GS	RS	US
2x	SP	!	"	#	¤	%	&	'	(	)	*	+	,	-	.	/
3x	0	1	2	3	4	5	6	7	8	9	:	;	<	=	>	?
4x	@	Α	Β	Γ	Δ	Ε	Ζ	Η	Θ	Ι		Κ	Λ	Μ	Ν	Ξ
5x	Ο	Π	Ρ	Σ	Τ	Υ	Φ		Χ	Ψ	Ω	[	\	]		_
6x	`	α	β	γ	δ	ε	ζ	η	θ	ι		κ	λ	μ	ν	ξ
7x	ο	π	ρ	σ	τ	υ	φ	ς	χ	ψ	ω	{	|	}	‾	DEL

== See also ==
- ISO/IEC 646
- ELOT 928
