= Basic Latin (Unicode block) =

U+0000 until U+007F

Basic Latin or C0 Controls and Basic Latin
- Range: U+0000..U+007F (128 code points)
- Plane: BMP
- Scripts: Latin (52 characters); Common (76 characters)
- Major alphabets: English
- Symbol sets: Arabic numerals Punctuation
- Assigned: 128 code points 33 Control or Format
- Unused: 0 reserved code points
- Source standards: ISO/IEC 8859, ISO 646

Unicode Version History
- 1.0.0 (1991): 128 (+128)

Unicode documentation
- Code chart ∣ Web page

The Basic Latin Unicode block, sometimes informally called C0 Controls and Basic Latin, is the first block of the Unicode standard, and the only block which is encoded in one byte in UTF-8. The block contains all the letters and control codes of the ASCII encoding. It ranges from U+0000 to U+007F, contains 128 characters and includes the C0 controls, ASCII punctuation and symbols, ASCII digits, both the uppercase and lowercase of the English alphabet and a control character.

The Basic Latin block was included in its present form from version 1.0.0 of the Unicode Standard, without addition or alteration of the character repertoire. Its block name in Unicode 1.0 was ASCII.

== Table of characters ==
Code	Result	Description	Acronym
C0 controls
U+0000		Null character	NUL
U+0001		Start of Heading	SOH
U+0002		Start of Text	STX
U+0003		End-of-text character	ETX
U+0004		End-of-transmission character	EOT
U+0005		Enquiry character	ENQ
U+0006		Acknowledge character	ACK
U+0007		Bell character	BEL
U+0008		Backspace	BS
U+0009		Horizontal tab	HT
U+000A		Line feed	LF
U+000B		Vertical tab	VT
U+000C		Form feed	FF
U+000D		Carriage return	CR
U+000E		Shift Out	SO
U+000F		Shift In	SI
U+0010		Data Link Escape	DLE
U+0011		Device Control 1	DC1
U+0012		Device Control 2	DC2
U+0013		Device Control 3	DC3
U+0014		Device Control 4	DC4
U+0015		Negative-acknowledge character	NAK
U+0016		Synchronous Idle	SYN
U+0017		End of Transmission Block	ETB
U+0018		Cancel character	CAN
U+0019		End of Medium	EM
U+001A		Substitute character	SUB
U+001B		Escape character	ESC
U+001C		File Separator	FS
U+001D		Group Separator	GS
U+001E		Record Separator	RS
U+001F		Unit Separator	US
ASCII punctuation and symbols
U+0020		Space	SP
U+0021	!	Exclamation mark	EXC
U+0022	"	Quotation mark	QUO
U+0023	#	Number sign	
U+0024	$	Dollar sign	
U+0025	%	Percent sign	
U+0026	&	Ampersand	
U+0027	'	Apostrophe	
U+0028	(	Left parenthesis	
U+0029	)	Right parenthesis	
U+002A	*	Asterisk	
U+002B	^{+}	Plus sign	
U+002C	,	Comma	
U+002D	-	Hyphen-minus	
U+002E	.	Full stop or period	
U+002F	/	Solidus or Slash	
ASCII digits
U+0030	0	Digit Zero	
U+0031	1	Digit One	
U+0032	2	Digit Two	
U+0033	3	Digit Three	
U+0034	4	Digit Four	
U+0035	5	Digit Five	
U+0036	6	Digit Six	
U+0037	7	Digit Seven	
U+0038	8	Digit Eight	
U+0039	9	Digit Nine	
ASCII punctuation and symbols
U+003A	:	Colon	
U+003B	;	Semicolon	
U+003C	<	Less-than sign	
U+003D	=	Equal sign	
U+003E	>	Greater-than sign	
U+003F	?	Question mark	
U+0040	@	At sign or Commercial at	
Uppercase Latin alphabet
U+0041	A	Latin Capital letter A	
U+0042	B	Latin Capital letter B	
U+0043	C	Latin Capital letter C	
U+0044	D	Latin Capital letter D	
U+0045	E	Latin Capital letter E	
U+0046	F	Latin Capital letter F	
U+0047	G	Latin Capital letter G	
U+0048	H	Latin Capital letter H	
U+0049	I	Latin Capital letter I	
U+004A	J	Latin Capital letter J	
U+004B	K	Latin Capital letter K	
U+004C	L	Latin Capital letter L	
U+004D	M	Latin Capital letter M	
U+004E	N	Latin Capital letter N	
U+004F	O	Latin Capital letter O	
U+0050	P	Latin Capital letter P	
U+0051	Q	Latin Capital letter Q	
U+0052	R	Latin Capital letter R	
U+0053	S	Latin Capital letter S	
U+0054	T	Latin Capital letter T	
U+0055	U	Latin Capital letter U	
U+0056	V	Latin Capital letter V	
U+0057	W	Latin Capital letter W	
U+0058	X	Latin Capital letter X	
U+0059	Y	Latin Capital letter Y	
U+005A	Z	Latin Capital letter Z	
ASCII punctuation and symbols
U+005B	[	Left Square Bracket	
U+005C	\	Backslash ^{[A]}	
U+005D	]	Right Square Bracket	
U+005E	^	Circumflex accent	
U+005F	_	Low line	
U+0060	`	Grave accent	
Lowercase Latin alphabet
U+0061	a	Latin Small Letter A	
U+0062	b	Latin Small Letter B	
U+0063	c	Latin Small Letter C	
U+0064	d	Latin Small Letter D	
U+0065	e	Latin Small Letter E	
U+0066	f	Latin Small Letter F	
U+0067	g	Latin Small Letter G	
U+0068	h	Latin Small Letter H	
U+0069	i	Latin Small Letter I	
U+006A	j	Latin Small Letter J	
U+006B	k	Latin Small Letter K	
U+006C	l	Latin Small Letter L	
U+006D	m	Latin Small Letter M	
U+006E	n	Latin Small Letter N	
U+006F	o	Latin Small Letter O	
U+0070	p	Latin Small Letter P	
U+0071	q	Latin Small Letter Q	
U+0072	r	Latin Small Letter R	
U+0073	s	Latin Small Letter S	
U+0074	t	Latin Small Letter T	
U+0075	u	Latin Small Letter U	
U+0076	v	Latin Small Letter V	
U+0077	w	Latin Small Letter W	
U+0078	x	Latin Small Letter X	
U+0079	y	Latin Small Letter Y	
U+007A	z	Latin Small Letter Z	
ASCII punctuation and symbols
U+007B	{	Left Curly Bracket	
U+007C	|	Vertical bar	
U+007D	}	Right Curly Bracket	
U+007E	~	Tilde	
Control character
U+007F	␡	Delete	DEL

^{A} The letter U+005C (\) may show up as a Yen(¥) or Won(₩) sign in Japanese/Korean fonts mistaking Unicode (especially UTF-8) as a legacy character set which replaced the backslash with these signs.

== Subheadings ==
The C0 Controls and Basic Latin block contains six subheadings.

=== C0 controls ===
The C0 Controls, referred to as C0 ASCII control codes in version 1.0, are inherited from ASCII and other 7-bit and 8-bit encoding schemes. The Alias names for C0 controls are taken from the ISO/IEC 6429:1992 standard.

=== ASCII punctuation and symbols ===
This subheading refers to standard punctuation characters, simple mathematical operators, and symbols like the dollar sign, percent, ampersand, underscore, and pipe.

=== ASCII digits ===
The ASCII Digits subheading contains the standard European number characters 1–9 and 0.

=== Uppercase Latin alphabet ===
The Uppercase Latin alphabet subheading contains the standard 26-letter unaccented Latin alphabet in the majuscule.

=== Lowercase Latin alphabet ===
The Lowercase Latin Alphabet subheading contains the standard 26-letter unaccented Latin alphabet in the minuscule.

=== Control character ===
The Control Character subheading contains the "Delete" character.

== Number of symbols, letters and control codes ==
The table below shows the number of letters, symbols and control codes in each of the subheadings in the C0 Controls and Basic Latin block.

Subheading	Number of symbols	Range of characters
C0 controls	32 control codes	U+0000 to U+001F
ASCII punctuation and symbols	33 punctuation marks and symbols	U+0020 to U+002F, U+003A to U+0040, U+005B to U+0060 and U+007B to U+007E
ASCII digits	10 digits	U+0030 to U+0039
Uppercase Latin Alphabet	26 unaccented Latin letters in the majuscule.	U+0041 to U+005A
Lowercase Latin Alphabet	26 unaccented Latin letters in the minuscule.	U+0061 to U+007A
Control character	1 control code containing the "Delete" character.	U+007F

== Chart ==
C0 Controls and Basic Latin (Note: As of Unicode version 18.0); Official Unicode Consortium code chart (PDF)
	0	1	2	3	4	5	6	7	8	9	A	B	C	D	E	F
U+000x	NUL	SOH	STX	ETX	EOT	ENQ	ACK	BEL	BS	HT	LF	VT	FF	CR	SO	SI
U+001x	DLE	DC1	DC2	DC3	DC4	NAK	SYN	ETB	CAN	EM	SUB	ESC	FS	GS	RS	US
U+002x	SP	!	"	#	$	%	&	'	(	)	*	+	,	-	.	/
U+003x	0	1	2	3	4	5	6	7	8	9	:	;	<	=	>	?
U+004x	@	A	B	C	D	E	F	G	H	I	J	K	L	M	N	O
U+005x	P	Q	R	S	T	U	V	W	X	Y	Z	[	\	]		_
U+006x	`	a	b	c	d	e	f	g	h	i	j	k	l	m	n	o
U+007x	p	q	r	s	t	u	v	w	x	y	z	{	|	}	~	DEL

== Variants ==
Several of the characters are defined to render as a standardized variant if followed by variant indicators.

A variant is defined for a zero with a short diagonal stroke: U+0030 DIGIT ZERO, U+FE00 VS1 (0︀).

Twelve characters (#, *, and the digits) can be followed by U+FE0E VS15 or U+FE0F VS16 to create emoji variants. They are keycap base characters, for example #️⃣ (U+0023 NUMBER SIGN U+FE0F VS16 U+20E3 COMBINING ENCLOSING KEYCAP). The VS15 version is "text presentation" while the VS16 version is "emoji-style".

Emoji variation sequences
U+	0023	002A	0030	0031	0032	0033	0034	0035	0036	0037	0038	0039
base	#	*	0	1	2	3	4	5	6	7	8	9
base+VS15+keycap	#︎⃣	*︎⃣	0︎⃣	1︎⃣	2︎⃣	3︎⃣	4︎⃣	5︎⃣	6︎⃣	7︎⃣	8︎⃣	9︎⃣
base+VS16+keycap	#️⃣	*️⃣	0️⃣	1️⃣	2️⃣	3️⃣	4️⃣	5️⃣	6️⃣	7️⃣	8️⃣	9️⃣

== History ==
The following Unicode-related documents record the purpose and process of defining specific characters in the Basic Latin block:

Version	Final code points (Note: Proposed code points and characters names may differ from final code points and names)	Count	UTC ID	L2 ID	WG2 ID	Document
1.0.0	U+0000..007F	128				(to be determined)
1.0.0	U+0000..007F	128	UTC/1999-013			Karlsson, Kent (1999-05-27), Tildes and micro sign decompositions
1.0.0	U+0000..007F	128		L2/99-176R		Moore, Lisa (1999-11-04), "Micro Sign Case Mappings", Minutes from the joint UTC/L2 meeting in Seattle, June 8-10, 1999
1.0.0	U+0000..007F	128		L2/04-145		Starner, David (2004-04-30), C with stroke character examples from BAE report 1884 (Dorsey)
1.0.0	U+0000..007F	128		L2/04-202		Anderson, Deborah (2004-06-07), Slashed C Feedback
1.0.0	U+0000..007F	128			N3046	Suignard, Michel (2006-02-22), Improving formal definition for control characters
1.0.0	U+0000..007F	128			N3103 (pdf, doc)	Umamaheswaran, V. S. (2006-08-25), "M48.33", Unconfirmed minutes of WG 2 meeting 48, Mountain View, CA, USA; 2006-04-24/27
1.0.0	U+0000..007F	128		L2/11-043		Freytag, Asmus; Karlsson, Kent (2011-02-02), Proposal to correct mistakes and inconsistencies in certain property assignments for super and subscripted letters
1.0.0	U+0000..007F	128		L2/11-160		PRI #181 Changing General Category of Twelve Characters, 2011-05-02
1.0.0	U+0000..007F	128		L2/11-261R2		Moore, Lisa (2011-08-16), "Consensus 128-C3", UTC #128 / L2 #225 Minutes, "Accept Ken Whistler's recommendations in L2/11-281 on name aliases for control characters with the addition of the abbreviations BEL and NUL."
1.0.0	U+0000..007F	128		L2/11-438 (Note: See also L2/10-458, L2/11-414, L2/11-415, and L2/11-429) (Note: Refer to the history section of the Miscellaneous Symbols and Pictographs block for additional emoji-related documents)	N4182	Edberg, Peter (2011-12-22), Emoji Variation Sequences (Revision of L2/11-429)
1.0.0	U+0000..007F	128		L2/15-107		Moore, Lisa (2015-05-12), "Consensus 143-C5", UTC #143 Minutes, "Add the 12 keycap sequences in emoji-data.txt as provisional named sequences in Unicode 8.0."
1.0.0	U+0000..007F	128		L2/15-268		Beeton, Barbara; Freytag, Asmus; Iancu, Laurențiu; Sargent, Murray (2015-10-30), Proposal to Represent the Slashed Zero Variant of Empty Set
1.0.0	U+0000..007F	128		L2/15-301 (Note: See also L2/15-198 and L2/15-275)		Pournader, Roozbeh (2015-11-01), A proposal for 278 standardized variation sequences for emoji
1.0.0	U+0000..007F	128		L2/15-254		Moore, Lisa (2015-11-16), "B.12.1.2 Proposal to Represent the Slashed Zero Variant of Empty Set", UTC #145 Minutes
1.0.0	U+0000..007F	128		L2/17-294	N4914	Lunde, Ken (2017-08-14), Proposal to add standardized variation sequence for U+FF10 FULLWIDTH DIGIT ZERO
1.0.0	U+0000..007F	128		L2/22-019		Scherer, Markus; et al. (2022-01-19), "F.2 F4: U+0019 in ISO vs. NameAliases.txt vs. chart/NamesList.txt", UTC #170 properties feedback & recommendations
1.0.0	U+0000..007F	128		L2/22-016		Constable, Peter (2022-04-21), "Consensus 170-C24", UTC #170 Minutes, "For U+0019, add a Name alias "EM" of type abbreviation, for Unicode version 15.0."

== See also ==
- Latin script in Unicode
- Latin-1 Supplement
- Character encoding
- ISO/IEC 8859-1
- Latin script
- ISO basic Latin alphabet
