= Windows code page =

Sets of characters used in the 1980s & 90s

Windows code pages are sets of characters or code pages (known as character encodings in other operating systems) used in Microsoft Windows from the 1980s and 1990s. Windows code pages were gradually superseded when Unicode was implemented in Windows, although they are still supported both within Windows and other platforms, and still apply when Alt code shortcuts are used.

Current Windows versions support Unicode. New Windows applications should use Unicode (UTF-8) and not 8-bit character encodings.

There are two groups of system code pages in Windows systems: OEM and Windows-native ("ANSI") code pages. (ANSI is the American National Standards Institute.) Code pages in both of these groups are extended ASCII code pages. Additional code pages are supported by standard Windows conversion routines, but not used as either type of system code page.

== ANSI code page ==
Windows-125x series
- Alias(es): ANSI (misnomer)
- Standard: WHATWG Encoding Standard
- Extends: ASCII
- Preceded by: ISO 8859
- Succeeded by: Unicode; UTF-16 (in Win32 API); UTF-8 (for files)

ANSI code pages (officially called "Windows code pages" after Microsoft accepted the former term being a misnomer) are used for native non-Unicode (say, byte oriented) applications using a graphical user interface on Windows systems. The term "ANSI" is a misnomer because these Windows code pages do not comply with any ANSI (American National Standards Institute) standard; code page 1252 was based on an early ANSI draft that became the international standard ISO 8859-1, which adds a further 32 control codes and space for 96 printable characters. Among other differences, Windows code-pages allocate printable characters to the supplementary control code space, making them at best illegible to standards-compliant operating systems. (Note: Standards-compliant systems should interpret data present at these codepoints as control instructions. In any case they would not be identified as printable characters.)

Most legacy "ANSI" code pages have code page numbers in the pattern 125x. However, 874 (Thai) and the East Asian multi-byte "ANSI" code pages (932, 936, 949, 950), all of which are also used as OEM code pages, are numbered to match IBM encodings, none of which are identical to the Windows encodings (although most are similar). While code page 1258 is also used as an OEM code page, it is original to Microsoft rather than an extension to an existing encoding. IBM have assigned their own, different numbers for Microsoft's variants, these are given for reference in the lists below where applicable.

All of the 125x Windows code pages, as well as 874 and 936, are labelled by Internet Assigned Numbers Authority (IANA) as "Windows-number", although "Windows-936" is treated as a synonym for "GBK". Windows code page 932 is instead labelled as "Windows-31J".

ANSI Windows code pages, and especially the code page 1252, were so called since they were purportedly based on drafts submitted or intended for ANSI. However, ANSI and ISO have not standardized any of these code pages. Instead they are either:

- Supersets of the standard sets such as those of ISO 8859 and the various national standards (like Windows-1252 vs. ISO-8859-1),
- Major modifications of these (making them incompatible to various degrees, like Windows-1250 vs. ISO-8859-2)
- Having no parallel encoding (like Windows-1257 vs. ISO-8859-4; ISO-8859-13 was introduced much later). Also, Windows-1251 follows neither the ISO-standardised ISO-8859-5 nor the then-prevailing KOI-8.

Microsoft assigned about twelve of the typography and business characters (including notably, the euro sign, €) in CP1252 to the code points 0x80–0x9F that, in ISO 8859, are assigned to C1 control codes. These assignments are also present in many other ANSI/Windows code pages at the same code-points. Windows did not use the C1 control codes, so this decision had no direct effect on Windows users. However, if included in a file transferred to a standards-compliant platform like Unix or MacOS, the information was invisible and potentially disruptive.

== OEM code page ==
The OEM code pages (original equipment manufacturer) are used by Win32 console applications, and by virtual DOS, and can be considered a holdover from DOS and the original IBM PC architecture. A separate suite of code pages was implemented not only due to compatibility, but also because the fonts of VGA (and descendant) hardware suggest encoding of line-drawing characters to be compatible with code page 437. Most OEM code pages share many code points, particularly for non-letter characters, with the second (non-ASCII) half of CP437.

A typical OEM code page, in its second half, does not resemble any ANSI/Windows code page even roughly. Nevertheless, two single-byte, fixed-width code pages (874 for Thai and 1258 for Vietnamese) and four multibyte CJK code pages (932, 936, 949, 950) are used as both OEM and ANSI code pages. Code page 1258 uses combining diacritics, as Vietnamese requires more than 128 letter-diacritic combinations. This is in contrast to VISCII, which replaces some of the C0 (i.e. ASCII) control codes.

== History ==
Early computer systems had limited storage and restricted the number of bits available to encode a character. Although earlier proprietary encodings had fewer, the American Standard Code for Information Interchange (ASCII) settled on seven bits: this was sufficient to encode a 96 member subset of the characters used in the US. As eight-bit bytes came to predominate, Microsoft (and others) expanded the repertoire to 224, to handle a variety of other uses such as box-drawing symbols. The need to provide precomposed characters for the Western European and South American markets required a different character set: Microsoft established the principle of code pages, one for each alphabet. For the segmental scripts used in most of Africa, the Americas, southern and south-east Asia, the Middle East and Europe, a character needs just one byte but two or more bytes are needed for the ideographic sets used in the rest of the world. The code-page model was unable to handle this challenge.

Since the late 1990s, software and systems have adopted Unicode as their preferred character encoding format: Unicode is designed to handle millions of characters. All current Microsoft products and application program interfaces use Unicode internally, but some applications continue to use the default encoding of the computer's 'locale' when reading and writing text data to files or standard output. Therefore, files may still be encountered that are legible and intelligible in one part of the world but unintelligible mojibake in another.

=== UTF-8, UTF-16 ===
Microsoft adopted UTF-16 (first the now-obsolete UCS-2, which was then Unicode's only encoding), for all its operating systems from Windows NT onwards, but additionally supports UTF-8 (also known as CP_UTF8) since Windows 10 version 1803. The rest of the industry (Unix-like systems and the web), and now Microsoft, chose UTF-8 (which is compatible with the 7-bit ASCII character set).

== List ==
The following Windows code pages exist:

=== Windows-125x series ===
These nine code pages are all extended ASCII 8-bit SBCS encodings, and were designed by Microsoft for use as ANSI codepages on Windows. They are commonly known by their IANA-registered names as windows-<number>, but are also sometimes called cp<number>, "cp" for "code page". They are all used as ANSI code pages; Windows-1258 is also used as an OEM code page.

The Windows-125x series includes nine of the ANSI code pages, and mostly covers scripts from Europe and West Asia with the addition of Vietnam. System encodings for Thai and for East Asian languages were numbered to match similar IBM code pages and are used as both ANSI and OEM code pages; these are covered in following sections.

ID	Description	Relationship to ISO 8859 or other established encodings
1250	Latin 2 / Central European	Similar to ISO-8859-2 but moves several characters, including multiple letters.
1251	Cyrillic	Incompatible with both ISO-8859-5 and KOI-8.
1252	Latin 1 / Western European	Superset of ISO-8859-1 (without C1 controls). Letter repertoire accordingly similar to CP850.
1253	Greek	Similar to ISO 8859-7 but moves several characters, including a letter.
1254	Turkish	Superset of ISO 8859-9 (without C1 controls).
1255	Hebrew	Almost a superset of ISO 8859-8, but with two incompatible punctuation changes.
1256	Arabic	Not compatible with ISO 8859-6; rather, OEM Code page 708 is an ISO 8859-6 (ASMO 708) superset.
1257	Baltic	Not ISO 8859-4; the later ISO 8859-13 is closely related, but with some differences in available punctuation.
1258	Vietnamese (also OEM)	Not related to VSCII or VISCII, uses fewer base characters with combining diacritics.

=== DOS code pages ===
These are also ASCII-based. Most of these are included for use as OEM code pages; code page 874 is also used as an ANSI code page.

- 437 – IBM PC US, 8-bit SBCS extended ASCII. Known as OEM-US, the encoding of the primary built-in font of VGA graphics cards.
- 708 – Arabic, extended ISO 8859-6 (ASMO 708)
- 720 – Arabic, retaining box drawing characters in their usual locations
- 737 – "MS-DOS Greek". Retains all box drawing characters. More popular than 869.
- 775 – "MS-DOS Baltic Rim"
- 850 – "MS-DOS Latin 1". Full (re-arranged) repertoire of ISO 8859-1.
- 852 – "MS-DOS Latin 2"
- 855 – "MS-DOS Cyrillic". Mainly used for South Slavic languages. Includes (re-arranged) repertoire of ISO-8859-5. Not to be confused with cp866.
- 857 – "MS-DOS Turkish"
- 858 – Western European with euro sign
- 860 – "MS-DOS Portuguese"
- 861 – "MS-DOS Icelandic"
- 862 – "MS-DOS Hebrew"
- 863 – "MS-DOS French Canada"
- 864 – Arabic
- 865 – "MS-DOS Nordic"
- 866 – "MS-DOS Cyrillic Russian", cp866. Sole purely OEM code page (rather than ANSI or both) included as a legacy encoding in WHATWG Encoding Standard for HTML5.
- 869 – "MS-DOS Greek 2", IBM869. Full (re-arranged) repertoire of ISO 8859-7.
- 874 – Thai, also used as the ANSI code page, extends ISO 8859-11 (and therefore TIS-620) with a few additional characters from Windows-1252. Corresponds to IBM code page 1162 (IBM-874 is similar but has different extensions).

=== East Asian multi-byte code pages ===
These often differ from the IBM code pages of the same number: code pages 932, 949 and 950 only partly match the IBM code pages of the same number, while the number 936 was used by IBM for another Simplified Chinese encoding which is now deprecated and Windows-951, as part of a kludge, is unrelated to IBM-951. IBM equivalent code pages are given in the second column. Code pages 932, 936, 949 and 950/951 are used as both ANSI and OEM code pages on the locales in question.

ID	Language	Encoding	IBM Equivalent	Difference from IBM CCSID of same number	Use
932	Japanese	Shift JIS (Microsoft variant)	943	IBM-932 is also Shift JIS, has fewer extensions (but those extensions it has are in common), and swaps some variant Chinese characters (itaiji) for interoperability with earlier editions of JIS C 6226.	ANSI/OEM (Japan)
936	Chinese (simplified)	GBK	1386	IBM-936 is a different Simplified Chinese encoding with a different encoding method, which has been deprecated since 1993.	ANSI/OEM (PRC, Singapore)
949	Korean	Unified Hangul Code	1363	IBM-949 is also an EUC-KR superset, but with different (colliding) extensions.	ANSI/OEM (Republic of Korea)
950	Chinese (traditional)	Big5 (Microsoft variant)	1373	IBM-950 is also Big5, but includes a different subset of the ETEN extensions, adds further extensions with an expanded trail byte range, and lacks the Euro.	ANSI/OEM (Taiwan, Hong Kong)
951	Chinese (traditional) including Cantonese	Big5-HKSCS (2001 ed.)	5471	IBM-951 is the double-byte plane from IBM-949 (see above), and unrelated to Microsoft's internal use of the number 951.	ANSI/OEM (Hong Kong, 98/NT4/2000/XP with HKSCS patch)

Microsoft code pages for Chinese, Japanese and Korean usually do not correspond exactly, and sometimes do not correspond at all, to the IBM code pages of the same number.

A few further multiple-byte code pages are supported for decoding or encoding using operating system libraries, but not used as either sort of system encoding in any locale.

ID	IBM Equivalent	Language	Encoding	Use
1361	-	Korean	Johab (KS C 5601-1992 annex 3)	Conversion
20000	-	Chinese (traditional)	An encoding of CNS 11643	Conversion
20001	-	Chinese (traditional)	TCA	Conversion
20002	-	Chinese (traditional)	x_Chinese-Eten	Conversion
20003	938	Chinese (traditional)	IBM 5550	Conversion
20004	-	Chinese (traditional)	Teletext	Conversion
20005	-	Chinese (traditional)	Wang	Conversion
20932	954 (roughly)	Japanese	EUC-JP	Conversion
20936	5479	Chinese (simplified)	GB 2312	Conversion
20949, 51949	970	Korean	Wansung (8-bit with ASCII, i.e. EUC-KR)	Conversion

=== EBCDIC code pages ===
ID	IBM Equivalent	Description
37		Country Extended Code Page for US, Canada, Netherlands, Portugal, Brazil, Australia, New Zealand
500		Country Extended Code Page for Belgium, Canada and Switzerland
870		EBCDIC Latin-2
875		EBCDIC Greek
1026		EBCDIC Latin-5 (Turkish)
1047		Country Extended Code Page for Open Systems (POSIX)
1140		Euro-sign Country Extended Code Page for US, Canada, Netherlands, Portugal, Brazil, Australia, New Zealand
1141		Euro-sign Country Extended Code Page for Austria and Germany
1142		Euro-sign Country Extended Code Page for Denmark and Norway
1143		Euro-sign Country Extended Code Page for Finland and Sweden
1144		Euro-sign Country Extended Code Page for Italy
1145		Euro-sign Country Extended Code Page for Spain and Latin America
1146		Euro-sign Country Extended Code Page for UK
1147		Euro-sign Country Extended Code Page for France
1148		Euro-sign Country Extended Code Page for Belgium, Canada and Switzerland
1149		Euro-sign Country Extended Code Page for Iceland
20273	273	Country Extended Code Page for Germany
20277	277	Country Extended Code Page for Denmark/Norway
20278	278	Country Extended Code Page for Finland/Sweden
20280	280	Country Extended Code Page for Italy
20284	284	Country Extended Code Page for Latin America/Spain
20285	285	Country Extended Code Page for United Kingdom
20290	290	Japanese Katakana EBCDIC
20297	297	Country Extended Code Page for France
20420	420	EBCDIC Arabic
20423	423	EBCDIC Greek with Extended Latin
20424	424	EBCDIC Hebrew
20833	833	Korean EBCDIC for N-Byte Hangul; x-EBCDIC-KoreanExtended
20838	838	EBCDIC Thai
20871	871	Country Extended Code Page for Iceland
20880	880	EBCDIC Cyrillic (DKOI)
20905	905	EBCDIC Latin-3 (Maltese, Esperanto and Turkish)
20924	924	EBCDIC Latin-9 (including Euro sign) for Open Systems (POSIX)
21025	1025	EBCDIC Cyrillic (DKOI) with section sign
21027	(1027)	Japanese EBCDIC (an incomplete implementation of IBM code page 1027, now deprecated)

=== Unicode-related code pages ===
ID	IBM Equivalent	Description
1200	1202, 1203	Unicode (BMP of ISO 10646, UTF-16LE). Available only to managed applications.
1201	1200, 1201	Unicode (UTF-16BE). Available only to managed applications.
12000	1234, 1235	UTF-32. Available only to managed applications.
12001	1232, 1233	UTF-32. Big-endian. Available only to managed applications.
65000	-	Unicode (UTF-7)
65001	1208, 1209	Unicode (UTF-8)

=== Macintosh compatibility code pages ===
ID	IBM Equivalent	Description
10000	1275	Apple Macintosh Roman
10001	-	Apple Macintosh Japanese
10002	-	Apple Macintosh Chinese (traditional) (BIG-5)
10003	-	Apple Macintosh Korean
10004	-	Apple Macintosh Arabic
10005	-	Apple Macintosh Hebrew
10006	1280	Apple Macintosh Greek
10007	1283	Apple Macintosh Cyrillic
10008	-	Apple Macintosh Chinese (simplified) (GB 2312)
10010	1285	Apple Macintosh Romanian
10017	-	Apple Macintosh Ukrainian
10021	-	Apple Macintosh Thai
10029	1282	Apple Macintosh Roman II / Central Europe
10079	1286	Apple Macintosh Icelandic
10081	1281	Apple Macintosh Turkish
10082	1284	Apple Macintosh Croatian

=== ISO 8859 code pages ===
ID	IBM Equivalent	Description
28591	819, 5100	ISO-8859-1 – Latin-1
28592	912	ISO-8859-2 – Latin-2
28593	913	ISO-8859-3 – Latin-3 or South European
28594	914	ISO-8859-4 – Latin-4 or North European
28595	915	ISO-8859-5 – Latin/Cyrillic
28596	-	ISO-8859-6 – Latin/Arabic
28597	813, 4909, 9005	ISO-8859-7 – Latin/Greek (1987 edition, i.e. without euro sign, drachma sign or iota subscript)
28598	-	ISO-8859-8 – Latin/Hebrew (visual order; 1988 edition, i.e. without LRM and RLM)
28599	920	ISO-8859-9 – Latin-5 or Turkish
28600	919	ISO-8859-10 – Latin-6 or Nordic
28601	-	ISO-8859-11 – Latin/Thai
28602	-	ISO-8859-12 – reserved for Latin/Devanagari but abandoned (not supported)
28603	921	ISO-8859-13 – Latin-7 or Baltic Rim
28604	-	ISO-8859-14 – Latin-8 or Celtic
28605	923	ISO-8859-15 – Latin-9
28606	-	ISO-8859-16 – Latin-10 or South-Eastern European
38596	1089	ISO-8859-6-I – Latin/Arabic (logical bidirectional order)
38598	916, 5012	ISO-8859-8-I – Latin/Hebrew (logical bidirectional order; 1988 edition, i.e. without LRM and RLM)

=== ITU-T code pages ===
ID	IBM Equivalent	Description
20105	1009	7-bit IA5 IRV (Western European)
20106	1011	7-bit IA5 German (DIN 66003)
20107	1018	7-bit IA5 Swedish (SEN 850200 C)
20108	1016	7-bit IA5 Norwegian (NS 4551-2)
20127	367	7-bit ASCII
20261	1036	T.61 (T.61-8bit)
20269	?	ISO-6937

=== KOI8 code pages ===
ID	IBM Equivalent	Description
20866	878	Russian – KOI8-R
21866	1167, 1168	Ukrainian – KOI8-U (or KOI8-RU in some versions)

== Problems arising from the use of code pages ==
Microsoft strongly recommends using Unicode in modern applications, but many applications or data files still depend on the legacy code pages.

- Programs need to know what code page to use in order to display the contents of (pre-Unicode) files correctly. If a program uses the wrong code page it may show text as mojibake.
- The code page in use may differ between machines, so (pre-Unicode) files created on one machine may be unreadable on another.
- Data is often improperly tagged with the code page, or not tagged at all, making determination of the correct code page to read the data difficult.
- These Microsoft code pages differ to various degrees from some of the standards and other vendors' implementations. This isn't a Microsoft issue per se, as it happens to all vendors, but the lack of consistency makes interoperability with other systems unreliable in some cases.
- The use of code pages limits the set of characters that may be used.
- Characters expressed in an unsupported code page may be converted to question marks (?) or other replacement characters, or to a simpler version (such as removing accents from a letter). In either case, the original character may be lost.
