= IBM 1015 =

Among IBM-related offerings, 1015 may refer to:

- Code page 1015, the Portuguese code page for an IBM-compatible PC
- IBM 1015 (terminal), a defunct display screen for the IBM System/360
