= Basic Latin =

Basic Latin may refer to:

- ISO basic Latin alphabet
- Basic Latin (Unicode block)

== See also ==
- Latin
- Latin script in Unicode
- ASCII, a character encoding standard
- ISO/IEC 646, specifying a 7-bit character code
- ISO/IEC 8859-1, which encodes "Latin alphabet no. 1"
