= ISO/IEC 8859-7 =

Standard

ISO/IEC 8859-7: Latin/Greek
- MIME / IANA: ISO-8859-7
- Alias(es): iso-ir-126, ELOT_928, ECMA-118, greek, greek8, csISOLatinGreek
- Languages: Greek, English
- Standard: ELOT 928, ISO/IEC 8859-7
- Classification: Extended ASCII, ISO 8859
- Preceded by: ELOT 927
- Other related encoding: Windows-1253

ISO/IEC 8859-7:2003, Information technology — 8-bit single-byte coded graphic character sets — Part 7: Latin/Greek alphabet, is part of the ISO/IEC 8859 series of ASCII-based standard character encodings, first edition published in 1987. It is informally referred to as Latin/Greek. It was designed to cover the modern Greek language. The original 1987 version of the standard had the same character assignments as the Greek national standard ELOT 928, published in 1986. The table in this article shows the updated 2003 version which adds three characters (0xA4: euro sign U+20AC, 0xA5: drachma sign U+20AF, 0xAA: Greek ypogegrammeni U+037A). Microsoft has assigned code page 28597 a.k.a. Windows-28597 to ISO-8859-7 in Windows. IBM has assigned code page 813 to ISO 8859-7. (IBM CCSID 813 is the original encoding. CCSID 4909 adds the euro sign. CCSID 9005 further adds the drachma sign and ypogegrammeni.)

ISO-8859-7 is the IANA preferred charset name for this standard (formally the 1987 version, but in practice there is no problem using it for the current version, as the changes are pure additions to previously unassigned codes) when supplemented with the C0 and C1 control codes from ISO/IEC 6429.

Unicode is preferred for Greek in modern applications, especially as UTF-8 encoding on the Internet. Unicode provides many more glyphs for complete coverage, see Greek alphabet in Unicode and Ancient Greek Musical Notation for tables.

== Code page layout ==
ISO/IEC 8859-7
	0	1	2	3	4	5	6	7	8	9	A	B	C	D	E	F
0x																
1x																
2x	SP	!	"	#	$	%	&	'	(	)	*	+	,	-	.	/
3x	0	1	2	3	4	5	6	7	8	9	:	;	<	=	>	?
4x	@	A	B	C	D	E	F	G	H	I	J	K	L	M	N	O
5x	P	Q	R	S	T	U	V	W	X	Y	Z	[	\	]		_
6x	`	a	b	c	d	e	f	g	h	i	j	k	l	m	n	o
7x	p	q	r	s	t	u	v	w	x	y	z	{	|	}	~	
8x																
9x																
Ax	NBSP	‘	’	£	€	₯	¦	§	¨	©	ͺ	«	¬	SHY		―
Bx	°	±	²	³	΄	΅	Ά	·	Έ	Ή	Ί	»	Ό	½	Ύ	Ώ
Cx	ΐ	Α	Β	Γ	Δ	Ε	Ζ	Η	Θ	Ι	Κ	Λ	Μ	Ν	Ξ	Ο
Dx	Π	Ρ		Σ	Τ	Υ	Φ	Χ	Ψ	Ω	Ϊ	Ϋ	ά	έ	ή	ί
Ex	ΰ	α	β	γ	δ	ε	ζ	η	θ	ι	κ	λ	μ	ν	ξ	ο
Fx	π	ρ	ς	σ	τ	υ	φ	χ	ψ	ω	ϊ	ϋ	ό	ύ	ώ	

Added in 2003

== See also ==
- Windows-1253
- ISO 5428
- ELOT 927
