= National Replacement Character Set =

Feature of computer terminals

DEC NRCS encoding family
- Invariant subset of NRCS. Red Bowen knots (⌘) denote national code points.
- Alias(es): National Replacement Character Set
- Preceded by: ASCII
- Succeeded by: ISO 8859, ISO 10646
- Other related encoding: ISO 646

The National Replacement Character Set (NRCS) was a feature supported by later models of Digital's (DEC) computer terminal systems, starting with the VT200 series in 1983. NRCS allowed individual characters from one character set to be replaced by one from another set, allowing the construction of different character sets on the fly. It was used to customize the character set to different local languages, without having to change the terminal's ROM for different countries, or alternately, include many different sets in a larger ROM. Many 3rd party terminals and terminal emulators supporting VT200 codes also supported NRCS.

== Description ==
ASCII is a 7-bit standard, allowing a total of 128 characters in the character set. Some of these are reserved as control characters, leaving 96 printable characters. This set of 96 printable characters includes upper and lower case letters, numbers, and basic math and punctuation.

ASCII does not have enough room to include other common characters such as multi-national currency symbols or the various accented letters common in European languages. This led to a number of country-specific varieties of 7-bit ASCII with certain characters replaced. For instance, the UK standard simply replaced ASCII's hash mark, #, with the pound symbol, £. This normally led to different models of a given computer terminal or printer, differing only in the glyphs stored in ROM. Some of these were standardized as part of ISO/IEC 646.

On an 8-bit clean serial link, ASCII can be expanded to support a total of 256 characters. In this case, instead of replacing the characters in the original printable characters range from 32 to 127, new characters are added in the 128 to 255 range. This offers enough room for a single character set to include all the variety of characters used in North America and western Europe. This capability led to the introduction of the ISO/IEC 8859-1 standard character set containing 191 characters of what it calls the "Latin alphabet no. 1", but normally referred to as "ISO Latin". Windows-1252 is a slightly expanded superset of ISO Latin.

NRCS was introduced to solve the problem of requiring different terminals for each country by allowing characters in the basic 7-bit ASCII set to be re-defined by copying the glyph from the DEC's version of ISO Latin, the Multinational Character Set (MCS). This meant that the ROM had to store only two character sets, standard ASCII and MCS, and could build any required local ASCII variant on the fly. For instance, instead of having a separate "UK ASCII" version of the terminal with a modified glyph in ROM, the terminal included an NRCS with instructions to replace the hash mark glyph with the pound. When used in the UK, typing Shift 3 produced the pound, the same keys pressed on a US terminal produced hash.

The NRCS could be set through a setup command, or more commonly, by replacing the keyboard with a model that sent back a code when first booted. That way simply plugging in a UK keyboard, which had a pound sign on the 3 key, automatically set the NRCS to that same replacement.

== NRC Sets ==
DEC terminals from the VT220 on had 12 different NRCS sets in addition to standard ASCII:

Character set	Code page	Standard	0x23	0x40	0x5B	0x5C	0x5D	0x5E	0x5F	0x60	0x7B	0x7C	0x7D	0x7E
Standard ASCII	367	ASCII, ISO 646-US IR 6	#	@	[	\	]		_	`	{	|	}	~
United Kingdom	1101	DEC, ISO	£	@	[	\	]		_	`	{	|	}	~
Denmark/Norway (Alternate)	1107	DEC, ISO	#	@	Æ	Ø	Å		_	`	æ	ø	å	~
Denmark/Norway	1105	DEC	#	Ä	Æ	Ø	Å	Ü	_	ä	æ	ø	å	ü
Dutch	1102	DEC	£	¾	ĳ	½	|		_	`	¨	ƒ	¼	´
Finnish	1103	DEC	#	@	Ä	Ö	Å	Ü	_	é	ä	ö	å	ü
French	1104	DEC, ISO	£	à	°	ç	§		_	`	é	ù	è	¨
French Canadian	1020	DEC	#	à	â	ç	ê	î	_	ô	é	ù	è	û
German	1011, 20106	ISO 646-DE IR 21, DIN 66003	#	§	Ä	Ö	Ü		_	`	ä	ö	ü	ß
Italian	1012	ISO 646-IT IR 15, UNI 0204-70	£	§	°	ç	é		_	ù	à	ò	è	ì
Japanese Roman	895	DEC, ISO	#	@	[	¥	]		_	`	{	|	}	‾
Portuguese	(Note: This DEC character set is similar to ISO 646-PT2 / IR 84 aka IBM code page 1015, except for code point 64 (0x40), which is assigned to "@" in the DEC character set, but to "´" in the ISO character set.)	DEC	#	@	Ã	Ç	Õ		_	`	ã	ç	õ	~
Spanish	1023	DEC, ISO	£	§	¡	Ñ	¿		_	`	˚ (°)	ñ	ç	~
Swedish	1106	DEC, ISO	#	É	Ä	Ö	Å	Ü	_	é	ä	ö	å	ü
Swiss	1021	DEC	ù	à	é	ç	ê	î	è	ô	ä	ö	ü	û

== See also ==
- 7-bit DEC Greek
- 7-bit DEC Hebrew (SI 960, HEBREW-7)
- 7-bit DEC Turkish (TR7DEC)
- 7-bit DEC Cyrillic (KOI-7)
