= Polish Committee for Standardization =

- Polski Komitet Normalizacyjny; PKN
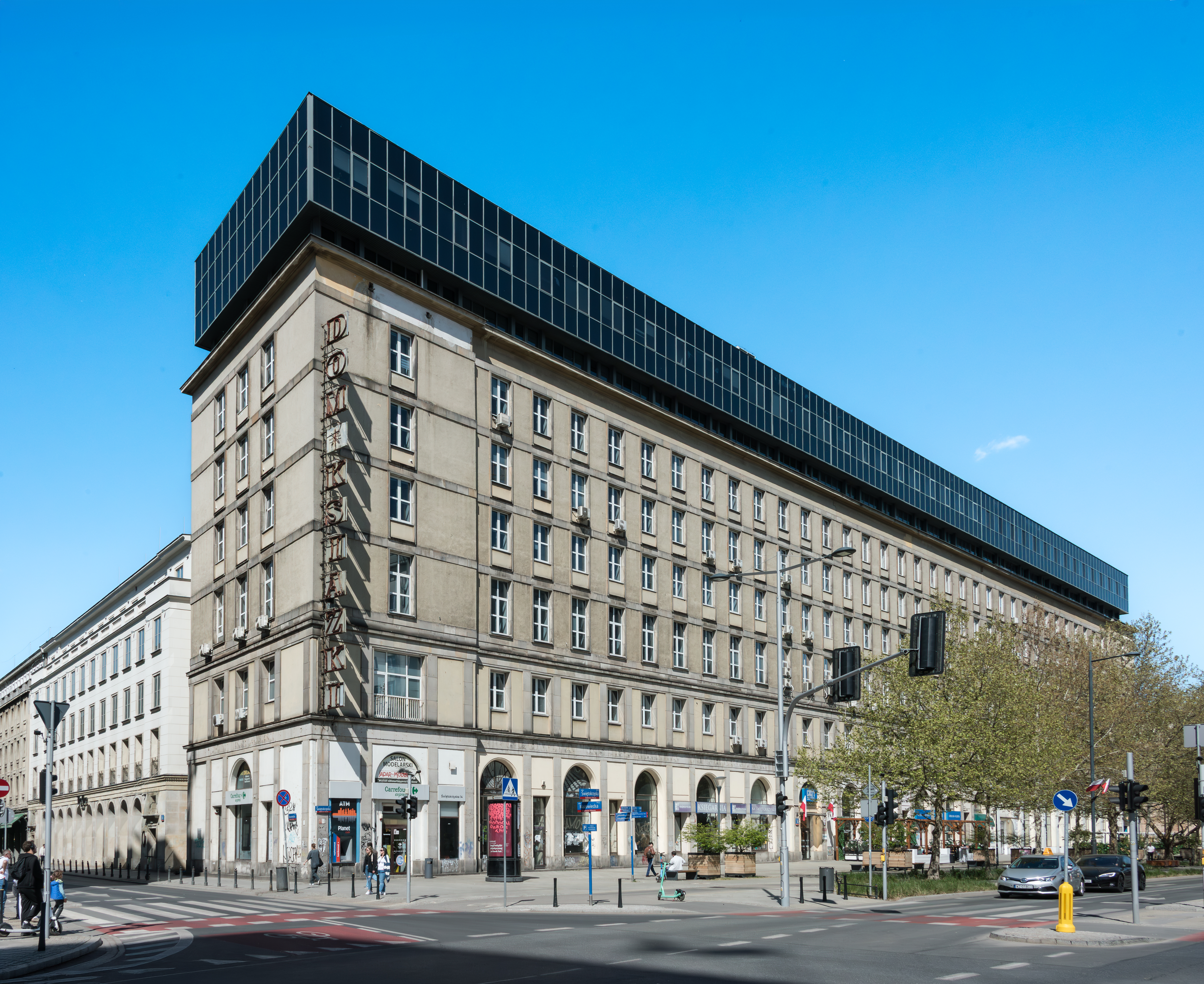
- Headquarters in Warsaw

Committee overview
- Formed: 1924; 102 years ago
- Preceding Committee: Polski Komitet Normalizacji, Miar i Jakości
- Jurisdiction: Poland
- Headquarters: Warsaw
- Employees: 243
- Committee executive: Tomasz Schweitzer
- Website: http://www.pkn.pl/

Footnotes
- Member of ISO

Polish Committee for Standardization (Polish: Polski Komitet Normalizacyjny) is a Polish governmental organization responsible for standardization. It was established in 1924.

== Polish Standard ==
Polish Standard (Polish: Polska Norma, PN, denoted by the symbol BS) - a nationwide standard, adopted by consensus and approved by the Polish Committee for Standardization, The Polish Standards are widely available but not free, and their distribution is controlled by the PKN.

== See also ==
- PN-83/P-55366
- Poland
- Typography
