= IBM 1015 (terminal) =

Display terminal

The IBM 1015 is a display terminal for the IBM System/360. IBM suggested that it be used for phone-based customer support.

== History ==
It was exhibited during the 1964 introduction of the IBM System/360 and included in the official System Summary. Other display devices introduced and co-marketed by IBM were the IBM 2250 and the IBM 2260.

== Product description ==
The screen was round, and it sat forward and above a keyboard. The display area could hold 30 lines, each with up to 40 characters, selected from A–Z, 0–9, and 26 special characters. Output was 650 characters per second. It came with a desk. Up to ten 1015s could be connected to the IBM 1016 Control Unit or the IBM 1414 Input/Output Synchronizer.
