= Extended ASCII =

Nickname for 8-bit ASCII-derived character sets

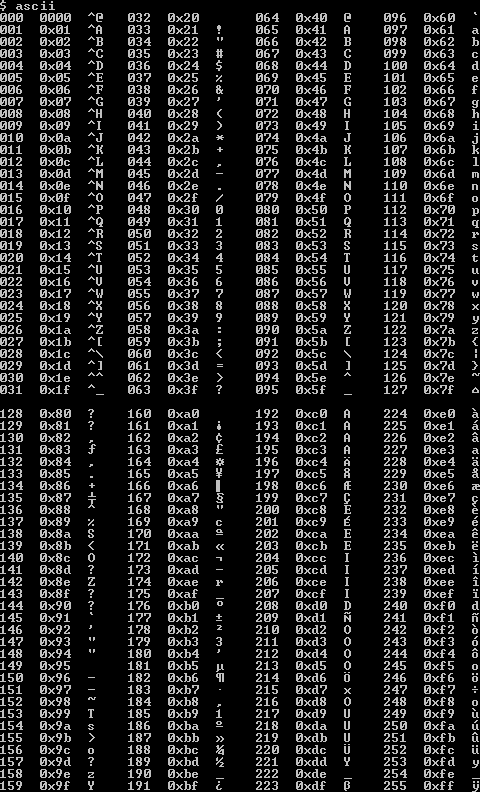
Output of the program ascii in Cygwin

Extended ASCII is a repertoire of character encodings that generally include the original 96 ASCII character set, plus up to 128 additional characters. There is no formal definition of "extended ASCII", and the use of the term has been criticized. (Note: because it can be mistakenly interpreted to mean that the American National Standards Institute (ANSI) had updated its ANSI X3.4-1986 standard to include more characters, or that the term identifies a single unambiguous encoding, neither of which is the case.)

The ISO standard ISO 8859 was the first international standard to formalise an expansion of the ASCII character set: of the many language variants it encoded, ISO 8859-1 – which supports most Western European languages – is best known in the West as ISO Latin-1. Since ISO 8859, there have been many other extended ASCII encodings. EBCDIC likewise developed many extended variants over the decades.

All modern operating systems use Unicode which supports thousands of characters. However, extended ASCII remains important in the history of computing, and supporting multiple extended ASCII character sets required software to be written in ways that made it much easier to support the UTF-8 encoding method later on.

== History ==
ASCII was designed in the 1960s for teleprinters and telegraphy, and some computing. Early teleprinters were electromechanical, having no microprocessor and just enough electromechanical memory to function. They fully processed one character at a time, returning to an idle state immediately afterward; this meant that any control sequences had to be only one character long, and thus a large number of codes needed to be reserved for such controls. They were typewriter-derived impact printers, and could only print a fixed set of glyphs, which were cast into a metal type element or elements, which also encouraged a minimum set of glyphs.

Seven-bit ASCII improved over prior five- and six-bit codes. Of the 2^{7}=128 codes, 33 were used for controls, and 95 carefully selected printable characters (94 glyphs and one space), which include the English alphabet (uppercase and lowercase), digits, and 31 punctuation marks and symbols: all of the symbols on a standard US typewriter plus a few selected for programming tasks. Some popular peripherals only implemented a 64-printing-character subset: Teletype Model 33 could not transmit "a" through "z" or five less-common symbols (`, {, |, }, and ~). and when they received such characters they instead printed "A" through "Z" (forced all caps) and five other mostly-similar symbols (@, [, \, ], and ^).

The ASCII character set is barely large enough for US English use, lacks many glyphs common in typesetting, and is far too small for universal use. Many more letters and symbols are desirable, useful, or required to directly represent letters of alphabets other than English, more kinds of punctuation and spacing, more mathematical operators and symbols (× ÷ ⋅ ≠ ≥ ≈ π etc.), some unique symbols used by some programming languages, ideograms, logograms, box-drawing characters, etc.

The biggest problem for computer users around the world was the needs of their local alphabets. ASCII's English alphabet almost accommodates European languages, if accented letters are written without accents or by using two-character approximations, such as ss for ß. Modified local variants of 7-bit ASCII appeared promptly, trading some lesser-used symbols for highly desired symbols or letters, such as replacing # with £ on UK Teletypes, \ with ¥ in Japan or ₩ in Korea, etc. At least 29 variant sets resulted. Twelve codepoints were modified by at least one national set, leaving only 82 "invariant" codes. Programming languages however had assigned meaning to many of the replaced characters, work-arounds were devised such as C three-character sequences ??< and ??> to represent { and }. Languages with dissimilar basic alphabets could use transliteration, such as replacing all the Latin letters with the closest match Cyrillic letters (resulting in odd but somewhat readable text when English was printed in Cyrillic or vice versa). Schemes were also devised so that two letters could be overprinted (often with the backspace control between them) to produce accented letters. Users were not comfortable with any of these compromises and they were often poorly supported.

When computers and peripherals standardized on eight-bit bytes in the 1970s, it became obvious that computers and software could handle text that uses 256-character sets at almost no additional cost in programming, and no additional cost for storage (assuming that the unused 8th bit of each byte was not reused in some way, such as error checking, Boolean fields, or packing 8 characters into 7 bytes). This would allow ASCII to be used unchanged and provide 128 more characters. Many manufacturers devised 8-bit character sets consisting of ASCII plus up to 128 of the unused codes. Thus encodings which covered all the major Western European (and Latin American) languages and more could be made.

128 additional characters is still not enough to cover all purposes, all languages, or even all European languages, so the emergence of many proprietary and national ASCII-derived 8-bit character sets was inevitable. Translating between these sets (transcoding) is complex (especially if a character is not in both sets); and was often not done, producing mojibake (semi-readable resulting text; often users learned how to manually decode it). There were eventually attempts at cooperation or coordination by national and international standards bodies in the late 1990s, but manufacturer-proprietary sets remained the most popular by far, primarily because the international standards excluded characters popular in or peculiar to specific cultures.

== Proprietary extensions ==
Various proprietary modifications and extensions of ASCII appeared on mainframe computers (Note: except on IBM mainframes, which used EBCDIC rather than ASCII) and minicomputers – especially in universities, to meet their need to support teaching of mathematics, science and languages.

Hewlett-Packard started to add European characters to their extended 7-bit / 8-bit ASCII character set HP Roman Extension around 1978/1979 for use with their workstations, terminals and printers. This later evolved into the widely used regular 8-bit character sets HP Roman-8 and HP Roman-9 (as well as a number of variants).

Atari and Commodore home computers added many graphic symbols to their non-standard ASCII (Respectively, ATASCII and PETSCII, based on the original ASCII standard of 1963).

The TRS-80 character set for the TRS-80 home computer added 64 semigraphics characters (0x80 through 0xBF) that implemented low-resolution block graphics. (Each block-graphic character displayed as a 2x3 grid of pixels, with each block pixel effectively controlled by one of the lower 6 bits.)

IBM introduced eight-bit extended ASCII codes on the original IBM PC and later produced variations for different languages and cultures. IBM called such character sets code pages and assigned reference numbers – both to those they themselves invented as well as to many invented and used by other manufacturers. Accordingly, character sets are very often indicated by their IBM code page number. In ASCII-compatible code pages, the lower 128 characters maintained their standard ASCII values, and different pages (or sets of characters) could be made available in the upper 128 characters. DOS computers built for the North American market, for example, used code page 437, which included accented characters needed for French, German, and a few other European languages, as well as some graphical line-drawing characters. The larger character set made it possible to create documents in a combination of languages such as English and French (though French computers usually use code page 850), but not, for example, in English and Greek (which required code page 737).

Apple Computer introduced their own eight-bit extended ASCII codes in Mac OS, such as Mac OS Roman. The Apple LaserWriter also introduced the Postscript character set.

Digital Equipment Corporation (DEC) developed the Multinational Character Set, which had fewer characters but more letter and diacritic combinations. It was supported by the VT220 and later DEC computer terminals. This later became the basis for other character sets such as the Lotus International Character Set (LICS), ECMA-94 and ISO 8859-1.

== ISO 8859 ==
In 1987, the International Organization for Standardization (ISO) published a set of standards for eight-bit ASCII extensions, ISO 8859. The most popular of these was ISO 8859-1 (also called "ISO Latin 1") which contains characters sufficient for the most common Western European languages. Other standards in the 8859 group included ISO 8859-2 for Eastern European languages using the Latin script and ISO 8859-5 for languages using the Cyrillic script, and others.

One notable way in which the ISO standards differ from some vendor-specific extended ASCII character sets, is that the first 32 codepoints in the extension block are reserved in the ISO standard for control use and are not available for printable characters. (Note: They are also reserved in Unicode.) This policy emulated the C0 control codes block that occupy the first 32 codepoints of ASCII. This aspect of the standard was almost universally ignored by other extended ASCII sets.

== Windows-1252 ==
Microsoft intended to use ISO 8859 standards in Windows, but soon replaced C1 control codes with additional characters, making the proprietary Windows-1252 character set. The added characters included "curly" quotation marks, the em dash, the euro sign, and the French and Finnish letters from ISO-8859-15. This became the most-used extended ASCII in the world, and often is used on the web even when 8859-1 is specified.

== Character set confusion ==
In order to correctly interpret and display text data (sequences of characters) that includes extended codes, software that reads or receives the text must use the specific encoding that text was written in. Choosing the wrong encoding causes the display of often wildly-incorrect characters, known by the Japanese term mojibake. Because ASCII is common between all "extended ASCII" encodings, using the wrong one results in readable English (or any language that is using only A-Z), as well as numbers and most punctuation surviving.

Many communications protocols, most importantly SMTP and HTTP, require the character encoding of content to be tagged with IANA-assigned character set identifiers, in an attempt to get software to interpret multiple encodings correctly. However the vast majority of software relies on a system setting indicating the user's preferred encoding, or compiles in an assumed setting.

In modern times, Unicode has replaced almost all uses of non-ASCII encodings. Because many Internet standards use ISO 8859-1, and because Microsoft Windows (for most languages used in Western Europe and the Americas) uses the CP1252 superset of ISO 8859-1, in general it is safe to assume that any byte stream that is not valid UTF-8 is in CP1252 or the system setting.

== See also ==
- ASCII art – Computer art form using text characters
- Digraphs and trigraphs (programming)
- Input method – Method for generating non-native characters on devices
- List of Unicode characters
- KOI-8 – Character set
