= Tab key =

Keyboard key often used for tabulated formatting

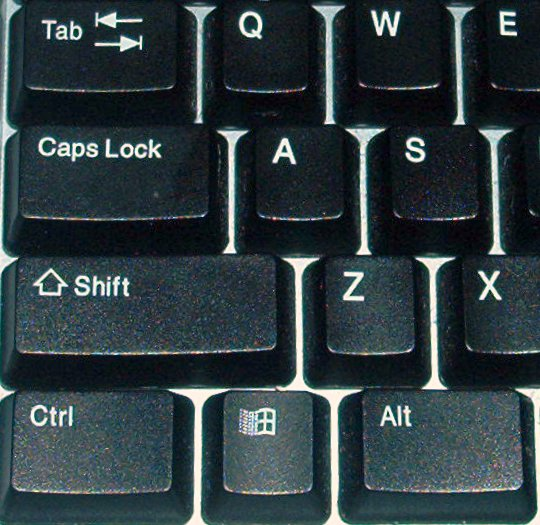
Tab key (top left) on a standard Windows keyboard

A tab key Tab ↹ is a key on a typical computer or typewriter keyboard that controls input. On a typewriter, it advances the insertion point to the next tab stop. In computing, sometimes it has the same behavior, but based on context, it is used for many other operations as well. For a typewriter, the terms tabulator key and tabular key were also used.

== History ==
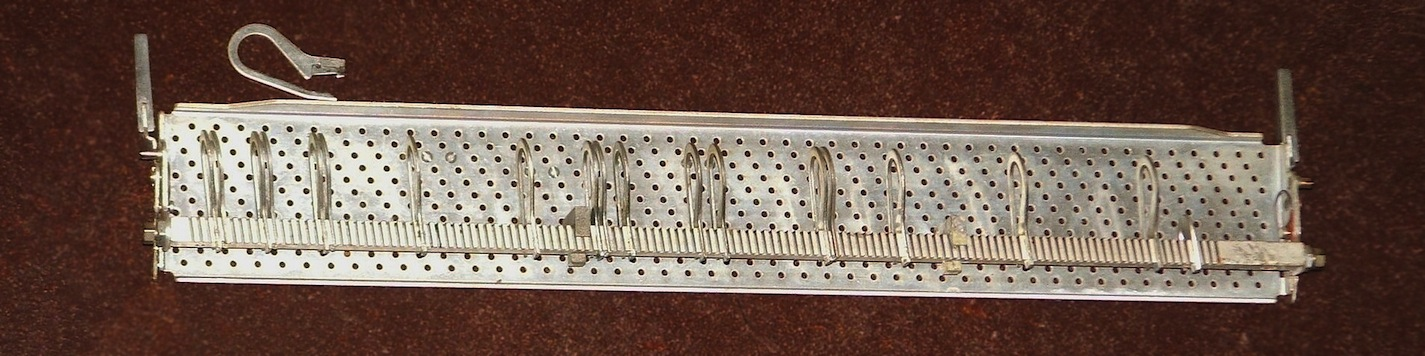
The tab rack from a Flexowriter model 2201. On this machine, the tab-rack is removable for easy reconfiguration.

The word tab derives from the word tabulate, which means "to arrange data in a tabular, or table, form". When a person wanted to type a table (of numbers or text) on a typewriter, there was a lot of time-consuming and repetitive use of the space bar and backspace key. To simplify this, a horizontal bar was placed in the mechanism called the tabulator rack. Pressing the tab key would advance the carriage to the next tabulator stop. The original tabulator stops were adjustable clips that could be arranged by the user on the tabulator rack. Fredric Hillard filed a patent application for such a mechanism in 1900.

The tab mechanism came into its own as a rapid and consistent way of uniformly indenting the first line of each paragraph. Often a first tab stop at 5 or 6 characters was used for this, far larger than the indentation used when typesetting. For numeric data, however, the logical place for the tab stop is the location of the least significant digit. Tabbing to this location and then pressing the backspace key to back up to the position of the first digit is practical but slow. Various schemes for numeric tabs were proposed. For example, in 1903, Harry Dukes and William Clayton filed for a patent on a tab mechanism with multiple tab keys numbered 1, 10, 100, etc. Pressing 1 was a simple tab. Pressing 10 advanced to the space before the tab, pressing 100 advanced to the position 2 spaces before the tab.

Initially tab stops were set by adding and removing clips from the tab rack, but Edward Hess working for the Royal Typewriter Company filed for a patent in 1904 covering a system where the tab stops were permanently mounted on the tab bar. To set or reset a tab for a particular column, the tab stop for that column was simply rotated in or out of engagement. In 1940, James Koca filed for a patent on a mechanism allowing the tab stops for each column to be set and cleared from the keyboard, eliminating the need for the typist to bend over the back of the machine to directly manipulate the tab rack. These keys, if present, are typically labeled tab set and tab clear.

== Use in computing ==
In computing, pressing Tab ↹ has various results based on context. Notable examples follow.

Word processor
Often in a word processor, Tab ↹ moves the cursor to the next tab stop (same as for a typewriter) or to the next cell of a table.
Data input
When filling out a form, Tab ↹ typically moves the cursor to the next field, eliminating the need to use a mouse to click in an adjacent field. Pressing ⇧ Shift+Tab ↹ typically moves the cursor to the previous field. In many graphical applications Tab ↹ moves the focus to the next control such as a button so that the user interface can be used without a mouse. This was part of the IBM Common User Access design. On macOS, this is called Full Keyboard Access.
Text editor
A text editor often allows the user to choose options related to a tab-key press. Typically, this involves setting the size of tab stops in terms of a number of spaces and whether to insert a tab character or spaces for a tab-key press. For spaces, pressing Tab ↹ inserts enough spaces to move the cursor to the next tab stop.
Tab completion
Tab completion can complete partially entered input. For example, in some command-line interfaces, the user may type the first few characters of a command or file-name, then press Tab ↹. If there is no ambiguity about the intent, the input is expanded to the complete form. On some systems, even if the input is ambiguous, tab completion reports a list of possible options.
In gaming
In PC video games, Tab ↹ often shows scores in multiplayer games. For a single-player game, it often shows the in-game world map or the player's inventory. It may also open the debug console in games based on Unreal Engine or Gamebryo.
