= Page break =

Marker in an electronic document

A page break is a marker in an electronic document that tells the document interpreter the content which follows is part of a new page. A page break causes a form feed to be sent to the printer during spooling of the document to the printer. It is one of the elements that contributes to pagination.

== Form feed ==
Form feed is a page-breaking ASCII control character. It directs the printer to eject the current page and to continue printing at the top of another. It will often also cause a carriage return. The form feed character code is defined as 12 (0xC in hexadecimal), and may be represented as Ctrl+L or ^L. In a related use, Ctrl+L can be pressed to clear the screen in Unix shells such as bash, or redraw the screen in TUI programs like vi/emacs. In the C programming language (and other languages derived from C), the form feed character is represented as '\f'. Unicode also provides the character U+21A1 ↡ DOWNWARDS TWO HEADED ARROW as a printable symbol for a form feed (not as the form feed itself). The form feed character is considered whitespace by the C character classification function isspace().

Form feed is rarely used when programming with modern printers in modern operating environments such as Windows, Unix, Linux or macOS. Instead, form feeds are generated by having the printing program call a form feed API function. For example, when printing using the .NET Framework, the PrintPageEventArgs.HasMorePages property is used to indicate a form feed is desired.

=== Semantic use ===
The form feed character is sometimes used in plain text files of source code as a delimiter for a page break, or as marker for sections of code. Some editors, in particular emacs and vi, have built-in commands to page up/down on the form feed character. This convention is predominantly used in Lisp code, and is also seen in C and Python source code. GNU Coding Standards require such form feeds in C.

In Usenet, the form feed character is used by several newsreaders as a "spoiler character", causing them to automatically hide the following text until prompted, as a way to prevent spoilers from being inadvertently revealed. The precise behavior depends on the client displaying the article. For example, Gnus displays "Next page..." in boldface, and switches to a second screen to display text after the form feed; slrn displays all non-space characters following the form feed as asterisks; Dialog turns the font and background color red between form feeds; and XRN simply inserts blank lines to fill the remainder of the article display area so the user must scroll down to reveal the spoiler. This use of the form feed character is not supported by all newsreaders, and is not standardized, although it has appeared in a draft of a Usenet Best Practices document by the IETF's USEFOR working group, as a feature that user agents should (but are not required to) support.

== See also ==
- Carriage control tape
- Newline
