= Cancel character =

Either of two control codes used to delete or rescind preceding data or characters

In telecommunications and character encoding, the term cancel character refers to a control character which may be either of:

1. "CAN", "Cancel", U+0018, or ^X used to indicate that the data with which it is associated are in error or are to be disregarded. Exact meaning can depend on protocol. For example:
  - In some journalistic text transmission formats, it signifies that the preceding word should be deleted; it is sometimes called "Kill Word" ("KW") in this context.
  - In some Videotex formats, it stops any running macros. In others, it clears the current line after the cursor position (compare EL).
2. "CCH", "Cancel Character", U+0094, or ESC T used to erase the previous character. This character was created as an unambiguous alternative to the much more common backspace character ("BS", U+0008), which has a now mostly obsolete alternative function of causing the following character to be superimposed on the preceding one.
