= Enquiry character =

Transmission control character

In computer communications, enquiry is a transmission-control character that requests a response from the receiving station with which a connection has been set up. It represents a signal intended to trigger a response at the receiving end, to see whether it is still present. The response, an answer-back code to the terminal that transmitted the WRU (who are you) signal, may include station identification, the type of equipment in service, and the status of the remote station.

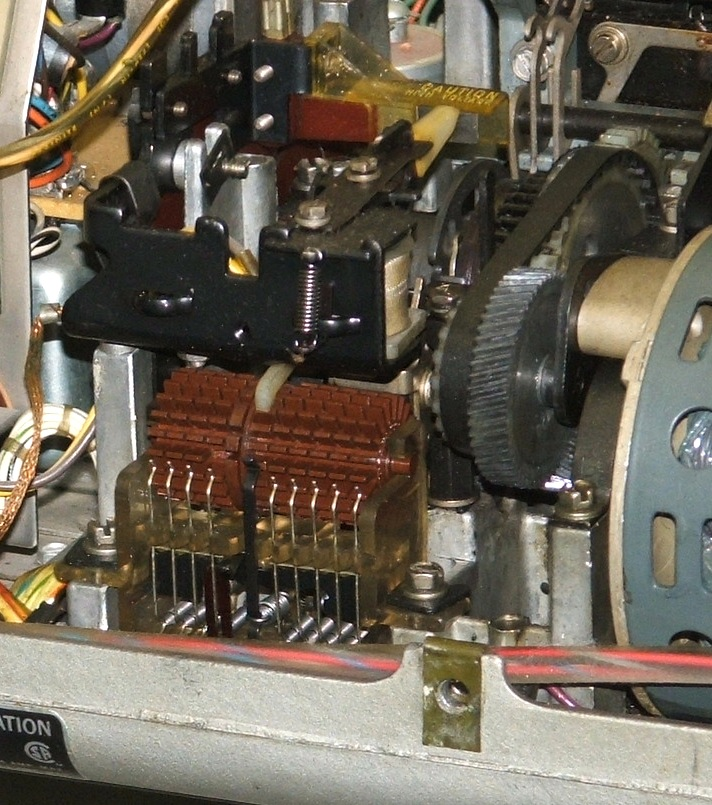
Teletype Model 33 answer-back drum (brown, lower center left) for coding inquiry response message

Some teleprinters had a "programmable" drum, which could hold a 20- or 22-character message. The message was encoded on the drum by breaking tabs off the drum. This sequence could be transmitted upon receipt of an enquiry signal, if enabled, or by pressing the "Here is" key on the keyboard.

The 5-bit ITA2 has an enquiry character, as do the later ASCII and EBCDIC.

In the 1960s, DEC routinely disabled the answerback feature on Teletype Model 33 terminals because it interfered with the use of the paper-tape reader and punch for binary data. However, the DEC VT100 terminals from 1978 responded to enquiry with a user-configurable answerback message, as did its successors.

== See also ==
- C0 and C1 control codes
- Keepalive
