= Nested quotation =

Quotations within quotations

A nested quotation is a quotation that is encapsulated inside another quotation, forming a hierarchy with multiple levels. When focusing on a certain quotation, one must interpret it within its scope. Nested quotation can be used in literature (as in nested narration), speech, and computer science (as in "meta"-statements that refer to other statements as strings). Nested quotation can be very confusing until evaluated carefully and until each quotation level is put into perspective.

== In literature ==
In languages that allow for nested quotes and use quotation mark punctuation to indicate direct speech, hierarchical quotation sublevels are usually punctuated by alternating between primary quotation marks and secondary quotation marks. For a comprehensive analysis of the major quotation mark systems employed in major writing systems, see Quotation mark.

== In programming ==
In the JavaScript programming language, nested quotes often become an issue using the eval keyword. The eval function is a function that converts and interprets a string as actual code, and runs that code. If that string is specified as a literal, then the code must be written as a quote itself (and escaped accordingly).

For example:

eval("var a=3; alert();");

This code declares a variable a, which is assigned the value 3, and a blank alert window is popped up to the user.

Suppose we then had to make a quote inside the quoted interpreted code. In JavaScript, you can only have one unescaped quote sublevel, which has to be the alternate of the top-level quote. If the 2nd-level quote symbol is the same as the first-level symbol, these quotes must be escaped. For example:

alert("I don't need to escape here");
alert('Nor is it "required" here');
alert('But now I do or it won\'t work');

A third-level nested quote must be escaped in order not to conflict with either the first- or second-level quote delimiters. This is true regardless of alternating-symbol encapsulation. Every level after the third level must be recursively escaped for all the levels of quotes in which it is contained. This includes the escape character itself, the backslash ("\"), which is escaped by itself ("\\").

For every sublevel in which a backslash is contained, it must be escaped for the level above it, and then all the backslashes used to escape that backslash as well as the original backslash, must be escaped, and so on and so forth for every level that is ascended. This is to avoid ambiguity and confusion in escaping.

Here are some examples that demonstrate some of the above principles:

document.write("<html><head></head><body><p>Hello, this is the body of the document.");
document.writeln("</p>");
document.write("<p>A newline in HTML code acts simply as whitespace, whereas a &lt;br&gt; starts a new line.");
document.write("</p></body></html>\n");

eval('eval(\"eval(\\\"alert(\\\\\\\"Now I\\\\\\\\\\\\\\\'m confused!\\\\\\\")\\\")\")');

Note that the number of backslashes increase from 0 to 1 to 3 to 7 to 15, indicating a $2^n-1$ rule for successively nested symbols, meaning that the length of the escape sequences grows exponentially with quotation depth.

== See also ==
- Leaning toothpick syndrome
- Embedded metalanguage
- Story within a story
- Play within a play
