= Escape sequence (disambiguation) =

An escape sequence, in computing, is a combination of characters that has a meaning other than the literal characters contained therein

Escape sequence may also refer to:

- ANSI escape codes, standardized escape sequences to control cursor location, color, font styling on video text terminals and terminal emulators
- Escape sequences in C (and similar languages), starting with a Backslash (\)
