= TIO =

TIO may refer to:

- Tia and Megumi Oumi, Japanese manga and anime characters
- Telecommunications Industry Ombudsman in Australia
- Territory Insurance Office, an insurance company in the Northern Territory (Australia)
- Marrara Oval, currently known as TIO Stadium due to naming rights
- Telescope Instruments Operator
- TIO codes, trigraphs on Hewlett-Packard calculators supporting RPL
