= Escape character =

Character used to start an escape sequence

In computing and telecommunications, an escape character is a character (more specifically a metacharacter) that, based on a contextual convention, specifies an alternative interpretation of the sequence of characters that follow it. The escape character plus the characters that follow it to form a syntactic unit is called an escape sequence. A convention can define any particular character code as a sequence prefix. Some conventions use a normal, printable character such as backslash (\) or ampersand (&). Others use a non-printable (a.k.a. control) character such as ASCII escape.

In telecommunications, an escape character is used to indicate that the following characters are encoded differently. This is used to alter control characters that would otherwise be noticed and acted on by the underlying telecommunications hardware, such as illegal characters. In this context, the use of an escape character is sometimes referred to as quoting.

== Definition ==
An escape character may not have its own meaning, so all escape sequences are of two or more characters.

Escape characters are part of the syntax for many programming languages, data formats, and communication protocols. For a given alphabet an escape character's purpose is to start character sequences (so named escape sequences), which have to be interpreted differently from the same characters occurring without the prefixed escape character.

The functions of escape sequences include:

- To encode a syntactic entity, such as device commands or special data, which cannot be directly represented by the alphabet.
- To represent characters, referred to as character quoting, which cannot be typed in the current context, or would have an undesired interpretation. In this case, an escape sequence is a digraph consisting of an escape character itself and a "quoted" character.

=== Control character ===
In contrast to an escape character, a control character (i.e. carriage return) has meaning on its own, without a special prefix or following characters. An escape character has no meaning on its own. It only has meaning in the context of a sequence.

Generally, an escape character is not a particular case of (device) control characters, nor vice versa. If we define control characters as non-graphic, or as having a special meaning for an output device (e.g. printer or text terminal) then any escape character for this device is a control one. But escape characters used in programming (such as the backslash, \) are graphic, hence are not control characters. Conversely most (but not all) of the ASCII "control characters" have some control function in isolation, therefore they are not escape characters.

In many programming languages, an escape character also forms some escape sequences which are referred to as control characters. For example, line break has an escape sequence of \n.

== Examples ==
=== JavaScript ===
JavaScript uses the \ (backslash) as an escape character for:

- \' single quote
- \" double quote
- \\ backslash
- \n new line
- \r carriage return
- \t tab
- \b backspace
- \f form feed
- \v vertical tab (Internet Explorer 9 and older treats \v as v instead of a vertical tab (\x0B). If cross-browser compatibility is a concern, use \x0B instead of \v.)
- \0 null character (U+0000 <control-0000> ) (only if the next character is not a decimal digit; else it is an octal escape sequence)
- \xFF character represented by the hexadecimal byte FF

The \v and \0 escapes are not allowed in JSON strings.

Example code:

console.log("Using \\n \nWill shift the characters after \\n one row down")
console.log("Using \\t \twill shift the characters after \\t one tab length to the right")
console.log("Using \\r \rWill imitate a carriage return, which means shifting to the start of the row") // can be used to clear the screen on some terminals. Windows uses \r\n instead of \n alone

A similar list is used by several other programming languages.

=== ASCII escape character ===
The ASCII "escape" character (octal: \033, hexadecimal: \x1B, or, in decimal, 27, also represented by the sequences ^[ or \e) is used in many output devices to start a series of characters called a control sequence or escape sequence. Typically, the escape character was sent first in such a sequence to alert the device that the following characters were to be interpreted as a control sequence rather than as plain characters, then one or more characters would follow to specify some detailed action, after which the device would go back to interpreting characters normally. For example, the sequence of ^[, followed by the printable characters [2;10H, would cause a Digital Equipment Corporation (DEC) VT102 terminal to move its cursor to the 10th cell of the 2nd line of the screen. This was later developed into ANSI escape codes covered by the ANSI X3.64 standard. The escape character also starts each command sequence in the Hewlett-Packard Printer Command Language.

An early reference to the term "escape character" is found in Bob Bemer's IBM technical publications, who is credited with inventing this mechanism during his work on the ASCII character set.

The Escape key is usually found on standard PC keyboards. However, it is commonly absent from keyboards for PDAs and other devices not designed primarily for ASCII communications. The DEC VT220 series was one of the few popular keyboards that did not have a dedicated Esc key, instead of using one of the keys above the main keypad. In user interfaces of the 1970s–1980s it was not uncommon to use this key as an escape character, but in modern desktop computers, such use is dropped. Sometimes the key was identified with AltMode (for alternative mode). Even with no dedicated key, the escape character code could be generated by typing [ while simultaneously holding down Ctrl.

=== Programming and data formats ===
Many modern programming languages specify the double-quote character (") as a delimiter for a string literal. The backslash (\) escape character typically provides two ways to include double-quotes inside a string literal, either by modifying the meaning of the double-quote character embedded in the string (\" becomes "), or by modifying the meaning of a sequence of characters including the hexadecimal value of a double-quote character (\x22 becomes "). Some languages such as Pascal and Python allow single-quote character (') as string literal delimiter.

C, C++, Java, and Ruby all allow exactly the same two backslash escape styles. The PostScript language and Microsoft Rich Text Format also use backslash escapes. The quoted-printable encoding uses the equals sign as an escape character.

URL and URI use %-escapes to quote characters with a special meaning, as for non-ASCII characters. The ampersand (&) character may be considered as an escape character in SGML and derived formats such as HTML and XML.

Some programming languages also provide other ways to represent special characters in literals, without requiring an escape character (see e.g. delimiter collision).

=== Communication protocols ===
The Point-to-Point Protocol (PPP) uses the 0x7D octet (\175, or ASCII: }) as an escape character. The octet immediately following should be XORed by 0x20 before being passed to a higher level protocol. This is applied to both 0x7D itself and the control character 0x7E (which is used in PPP to mark the beginning and end of a frame) when those octets need to be transmitted by a higher level protocol encapsulated by PPP, as well as other octets negotiated when the link is established. That is, when a higher level protocol wishes to transmit 0x7D, it is transmitted as the sequence 0x7D 0x5D, and 0x7E is transmitted as 0x7D 0x5E.

=== Bourne shell ===
In Bourne shell (sh), the asterisk (*) and question mark (?) characters are wildcard characters expanded via globbing. Without a preceding escape character, an * will expand to the names of all files in the working directory that do not start with a period if and only if there are such files, otherwise * remains unexpanded. So to refer to a file literally called "*", the shell must be told not to interpret it in this way, by preceding it with a backslash (\). This modifies the interpretation of the asterisk (*).

Compare:

rm *    # delete all files in the current directory

rm \*   # delete the file named *

Similarly, characters like the ampersand, pipe and semicolon (used for command chaining), angle brackets (used for redirection), and parentheses have special syntactic meaning to the Bourne shell. These must also be escaped—referred to as "quoting" in the sh(1) manual page—in order to be used literally as arguments to another program:

$ echo (｀-´)>     # not escaped or quoted
bash: syntax error near unexpected token `｀-´'

$ echo \(｀-´\)\>  # escaped with backslashes
(｀-´)>

$ echo '(｀-´)>'   # protected by single quotes; same effect as above
(｀-´)>

$ echo ;)          # syntax error
$ echo ';)' \;\)   # both OK

=== Windows Command Prompt ===
The Windows command-line interpreter uses a caret character (^) to escape reserved characters that have special meanings (in particular: &, |, (, ), <, >, ^). The DOS command-line interpreter, though it has similar syntax, does not support this.

For example, on the Windows Command Prompt, this will result in a syntax error.

C:\>echo <hello world>
The syntax of the command is incorrect.

whereas this will output the string: <hello world>

C:\>echo ^<hello world^>
<hello world>

=== Windows PowerShell ===
In Windows, the backslash is used as a path separator; therefore, it generally cannot be used as an escape character. PowerShell uses backtick ( ` ) instead.

For example, the following command:

PS C:\> echo "`tFirst line`nNew line"
        First line
New line

=== Others ===
- Quoted-printable, which encodes 8-bit data into 7-bit data of limited line lengths, uses the equals sign (=) as an escape character.

=== Summary ===
These characters are mentioned as used as escape characters or string literal delimiters.

- \x1B ASCII escape character
- " \x22 String literal delimiter
- % \x25 Percent-encoding
- & \x26 SGML, HTML and XML
- ' \x27 String literal delimiter
- = \x3D Quoted-printable
- \ \x5C Many programming languages
- ` \x60 Windows PowerShell
- } \x7D Point-to-Point Protocol

and more occur for this purpose, such as $, #, *, +, ;, <, >, ? , @ and ~

== See also ==
- AltGr key – Modifier key on some computer keyboards
- Escape sequences in C – Special character sequences in the C programming language
- Leaning toothpick syndrome – Escape characters making an expression unreadable
- Nested quotation – Quotations within quotations
- Stropping (syntax) – Method in computer language design
