= Illegal character =

Computer character not a allowed in a given context

In computer science, an illegal character is a character that is not allowed by a certain programming language, protocol, or program. To avoid illegal characters, some languages may use an escape character which is a backslash followed by another character.

== Examples ==
=== Windows ===
In the Windows operating system, illegal characters in file and folder names include colons, brackets, question marks, and null characters.

Illegal characters in Windows file names
Character	Name
<	less than
>	greater than
:	colon
"	speech marks
/	forward slash
\	backslash
|	pipe
?	question mark
*	asterisk
