= Metacharacter =

Character that has a special meaning to a computer program

A metacharacter is a character that has a special meaning to a computer program, such as a shell interpreter or a regular expression (regex) engine. For instance, in XML, the < character is interpreted not as ordinary text (in which it would be the less-than sign), but rather as a metacharacter signalling the beginning of an XML tag.

== In POSIX extended regular expressions ==
In POSIX extended regular expressions, there are 15 metacharacters that must be escaped — preceded by a backslash (\) — in order to drop their special meaning and be treated literally inside an expression: opening and closing square brackets ([ and ]); backslash (\); caret (^); dollar sign ($); period/full stop/dot (.); vertical bar/pipe symbol (|); question mark (?); asterisk (*); plus and minus signs (+ and -); opening and closing curly brackets/braces ({ and }); and opening and closing parentheses (( and )).

For example, to match the arithmetic expression (1+1)*3=6 with a regex, the correct regex is \(1\+1\)\*3=6; otherwise, the parentheses, plus sign, and asterisk will have special meanings.

== Other examples ==
Some other characters may have special meaning in some environments.

- In some Unix shells the semicolon (";") is a statement separator.
- In XML and HTML, the ampersand ("&") introduces an HTML entity. It also has special meaning in MS-DOS/Windows Command Prompt.
- In some Unix shells and MS-DOS/Windows Command Prompt, the less-than sign and greater-than sign ("<" and ">") are used for redirection and the backtick/grave accent ("`") is used for command substitution.
- In many programming languages, strings are delimited using quotes (" or '). In some cases, escape characters (and other methods) are used to avoid delimiter collision, e.g. "He said, \"Hello\"".
- In printf format strings, the percent sign ("%") is used to introduce format specifiers and must be escaped as "%%" to be interpreted literally. In SQL, the percent is used as a wildcard character.
- In SQL, the underscore ("_") is used to match any single character.

== Escaping ==
The term "to escape a metacharacter" means to make the metacharacter ineffective (to strip it of its special meaning), causing it to have its literal meaning. For example, in PCRE, a dot (".") stands for any single character. The regular expression "A.C" will match "ABC", "A3C", or even "A C". However, if the "." is escaped, it will lose its meaning as a metacharacter and will be interpreted literally as ".", causing the regular expression "A\.C" to only match the string "A.C".

The usual way to escape a character in a regex and elsewhere is by prefixing it with a backslash ("\"). Other environments may employ different methods, like MS-DOS/Windows Command Prompt, where a caret ("^") is used instead.

== See also ==
- Markup language – Modern system for document annotation
- Representative glyph – Non-specific archetype to represent a grapheme
