= Code page 1017 =

Computer character set for Danish

Code page 1017 (CCSID 1017), also known as CP1017, is IBM's code page for the Danish version of ISO 646 (ISO-646-DK), specified in DS 2089.

== Code page layout ==
Code page 1017
	0	1	2	3	4	5	6	7	8	9	A	B	C	D	E	F
0x	NUL	SOH	STX	ETX	EOT	ENQ	ACK	BEL	BS	HT	LF	VT	FF	CR	SO	SI
1x	DLE	DC1	DC2	DC3	DC4	NAK	SYN	ETB	CAN	EM	SUB	ESC	FS	GS	RS	US
2x	SP	!	"	#	¤	%	&	'	(	)	*	+	,	-	.	/
3x	0	1	2	3	4	5	6	7	8	9	:	;	<	=	>	?
4x	@	A	B	C	D	E	F	G	H	I	J	K	L	M	N	O
5x	P	Q	R	S	T	U	V	W	X	Y	Z	Æ	Ø	Å	Ü	_
6x	`	a	b	c	d	e	f	g	h	i	j	k	l	m	n	o
7x	p	q	r	s	t	u	v	w	x	y	z	æ	ø	å	ü	DEL
Differences from ASCII

== See also ==
- Code page 1105 (similar DEC NRCS code page)
- Code page 1107 (similar DEC NRCS code page)
