= Code page 1107 =

7-bit character set

Code page 1107 (CCSID 1107), also known as CP1107, is an IBM code page number assigned to the alternate Denmark/Norway variant of DEC's National Replacement Character Set (NRCS). The 7-bit character set was introduced for DEC's computer terminal systems, starting with the VT200 series in 1983, but is also used by IBM for their DEC emulation. Similar but not identical to the series of ISO 646 character sets, the character set is a close derivation from ASCII with only six code points differing.

== Code page layout ==
Code page 1107 (DEC NRCS alternate Denmark/Norway)
	0	1	2	3	4	5	6	7	8	9	A	B	C	D	E	F
0x	NUL	SOH	STX	ETX	EOT	ENQ	ACK	BEL	BS	HT	LF	VT	FF	CR	SO	SI
1x	DLE	DC1	DC2	DC3	DC4	NAK	SYN	ETB	CAN	EM	SUB	ESC	FS	GS	RS	US
2x	SP	!	"	#	$	%	&	'	(	)	*	+	,	-	.	/
3x	0	1	2	3	4	5	6	7	8	9	:	;	<	=	>	?
4x	@	A	B	C	D	E	F	G	H	I	J	K	L	M	N	O
5x	P	Q	R	S	T	U	V	W	X	Y	Z	Æ	Ø	Å		_
6x	`	a	b	c	d	e	f	g	h	i	j	k	l	m	n	o
7x	p	q	r	s	t	u	v	w	x	y	z	æ	ø	å	~	DEL
Differences from ASCII

== See also ==
- Code page 1105 (default Denmark/Norway NRCS)
- Code page 1016 (similar ISO-646-NO code page)
- Code page 1017 (similar ISO-646-DK code page)
- National Replacement Character Set (NRCS)
