= Windows Cyrillic + German =

Character encoding for Cyrillic script on German keyboards

Windows Cyrillic + German is a modification of Windows-1251 that was used by Paratype to cover languages that use the Cyrillic script such as Russian, Bulgarian, and Serbian Cyrillic on a German language keyboard. This encoding was also used by Gamma Productions (now Unitype). This encoding is supported by FontLab Studio 5.

== Character set ==
The following table shows Windows Cyrillic + German. Each character is shown with its Unicode equivalent and its decimal code.

Windows Cyrillic + German
	0	1	2	3	4	5	6	7	8	9	A	B	C	D	E	F
0x	NUL	SOH	STX	ETX	EOT	ENQ	ACK	BEL	BS	HT	LF	VT	FF	CR	SO	SI
1x	DLE	DC1	DC2	DC3	DC4	NAK	SYN	ETB	CAN	EM	SUB	ESC	FS	GS	RS	US
2x	SP	!	"	#	$	%	&	'	(	)	*	+	,	-	.	/
3x	0	1	2	3	4	5	6	7	8	9	:	;	<	=	>	?
4x	@	A	B	C	D	E	F	G	H	I	J	K	L	M	N	O
5x	P	Q	R	S	T	U	V	W	X	Y	Z	[	\	]		_
6x	`	a	b	c	d	e	f	g	h	i	j	k	l	m	n	o
7x	p	q	r	s	t	u	v	w	x	y	z	{	|	}	~	DEL
8x	Ђ	Ѓ	‚	ѓ	„	…	†	‡	ˆ	‰	Љ	‹	Њ	Ќ	Ћ	Џ
9x	ђ	‘	’	“	”	•	–	—	˜	™	љ	›	њ	ќ	ћ	џ
Ax	NBSP	Ў	ў	Ц	¤	Я	¦	§	Ё	©	Є	«	¬	SHY	®	Ї
Bx	°	±	Д	д	´	µ	¶	·	ё	№	є	»	ц	Ь	ь	ї
Cx	А	Б	В	Г	Ä	Е	Ж	З	И	Й	К	Л	М	Н	О	П
Dx	Р	С	Т	У	Ф	Х	Ö	Ч	Ш	Щ	Ъ	Ы	Ü	Э	Ю	ß
Ex	а	б	в	г	ä	е	ж	з	и	й	к	л	м	н	о	п
Fx	р	с	т	у	ф	х	ö	ч	ш	щ	ъ	ы	ü	э	ю	я

Differences from Windows-1251
