= Code page 1012 =

Computer character set for Italian

Code page 1012 (CCSID 1012), also known as CP1012 or I7DEC, is IBM's code page for the Italian version of ISO 646, also known as ISO 646-IT IR 15. The character set was originally specified in UNI 0204-70. It is also part of DEC's National Replacement Character Set (NRCS) for their VT220 terminals.

== Code page layout ==
Code page 1012 (ISO 646-IT / IR 15)
	0	1	2	3	4	5	6	7	8	9	A	B	C	D	E	F
0x	NUL	SOH	STX	ETX	EOT	ENQ	ACK	BEL	BS	HT	LF	VT	FF	CR	SO	SI
1x	DLE	DC1	DC2	DC3	DC4	NAK	SYN	ETB	CAN	EM	SUB	ESC	FS	GS	RS	US
2x	SP	!	"	£	$	%	&	'	(	)	*	+	,	-	.	/
3x	0	1	2	3	4	5	6	7	8	9	:	;	<	=	>	?
4x	§	A	B	C	D	E	F	G	H	I	J	K	L	M	N	O
5x	P	Q	R	S	T	U	V	W	X	Y	Z	°	ç	é		_
6x	ù	a	b	c	d	e	f	g	h	i	j	k	l	m	n	o
7x	p	q	r	s	t	u	v	w	x	y	z	à	ò	è	ì	DEL
Differences from ASCII
