= Code page 1105 =

Computer character set for Nordic languages

Code page 1105 (CCSID 1105), also known as CP1105, is an IBM code page number assigned to the Denmark/Norway variant of DEC's National Replacement Character Set (NRCS). The 7-bit character set was introduced for DEC's computer terminal systems, starting with the VT200 series in 1983, but is also used by IBM for their DEC emulation. Similar but not identical to the series of ISO 646 character sets, the character set is a close derivation from ASCII with only ten code points differing.

== Code page layout ==
Code page 1105 (DEC NRCS Denmark/Norway)
	0	1	2	3	4	5	6	7	8	9	A	B	C	D	E	F
0x	NUL	SOH	STX	ETX	EOT	ENQ	ACK	BEL	BS	HT	LF	VT	FF	CR	SO	SI
1x	DLE	DC1	DC2	DC3	DC4	NAK	SYN	ETB	CAN	EM	SUB	ESC	FS	GS	RS	US
2x	SP	!	"	#	$	%	&	'	(	)	*	+	,	-	.	/
3x	0	1	2	3	4	5	6	7	8	9	:	;	<	=	>	?
4x	Ä	A	B	C	D	E	F	G	H	I	J	K	L	M	N	O
5x	P	Q	R	S	T	U	V	W	X	Y	Z	Æ	Ø	Å	Ü	_
6x	ä	a	b	c	d	e	f	g	h	i	j	k	l	m	n	o
7x	p	q	r	s	t	u	v	w	x	y	z	æ	ø	å	ü	DEL
Differences from ASCII

== See also ==
- Code page 1107 (alternate Denmark/Norway NRCS)
- Code page 1017 (similar ISO-646-DK code page)
- National Replacement Character Set (NRCS)
