= Code page 1104 =

Computer character set for French

Code page 1104 (CCSID 1104), also known as CP1104, F7DEC, ISO-IR-025 or NF Z 62-010 (1973) is an IBM code page number assigned to the French variant of DEC's National Replacement Character Set (NRCS). The 7-bit character set was introduced for DEC's computer terminal systems, starting with the VT200 series in 1983, but it is also used by IBM for their DEC emulation.

ISO-IR-025 was previously also the French variant of ISO 646 (NF Z 62-010), it was superseded by Code page 1010 (NF Z 62-010:1982, ISO-IR-069) in that respect, from which it differs in only one point. It is also a close derivation from ASCII, with only nine code points differing.

== Code page layout ==
Code page 1104 (DEC NRCS French)
	0	1	2	3	4	5	6	7	8	9	A	B	C	D	E	F
0x	NUL	SOH	STX	ETX	EOT	ENQ	ACK	BEL	BS	HT	LF	VT	FF	CR	SO	SI
1x	DLE	DC1	DC2	DC3	DC4	NAK	SYN	ETB	CAN	EM	SUB	ESC	FS	GS	RS	US
2x	SP	!	"	£	$	%	&	'	(	)	*	+	,	-	.	/
3x	0	1	2	3	4	5	6	7	8	9	:	;	<	=	>	?
4x	à	A	B	C	D	E	F	G	H	I	J	K	L	M	N	O
5x	P	Q	R	S	T	U	V	W	X	Y	Z	°	ç	§		_
6x	`	a	b	c	d	e	f	g	h	i	j	k	l	m	n	o
7x	p	q	r	s	t	u	v	w	x	y	z	é	ù	è	¨	DEL

Differences from ASCII

== See also ==
- Code page 1010 (similar ISO 646-FR code page)
- Code page 1020 (French-Canadian NRCS)
- National Replacement Character Set (NRCS)
