= JIS X 0211 =

Control codes

JIS X 0211, originally designated JIS C 6323 is a Japanese Industrial Standard defining C0 and C1 control codes and control sequences. It was first established in 1986, with subsequent editions in 1991 and 1994.

It defines C0 and C1 control characters for use with other JIS coded character sets, e.g. JIS X 0201 and JIS X 0208. It is a derivative of ISO/IEC 6429 (ECMA-48); however, it does not feature all control functions presently listed by ISO/IEC 6429. It is distinct from the now-withdrawn JIS X 0207 (JIS C 6225), an earlier JIS standard for control codes which was established in 1979, which used a different syntax for control sequences.

== Code page layout ==
JIS X 0211
	0	1	2	3	4	5	6	7	8	9	A	B	C	D	E	F
0x	NUL	SOH	STX	ETX	EOT	ENQ	ACK	BEL	BS	HT	LF	VT	FF	CR	SO	SI
1x	DLE	DC1	DC2	DC3	DC4	NAK	SYN	ETB	CAN	EM	SUB	ESC	FS	GS	RS	US
2x	SP															
3x																
4x																
5x																
6x																
7x																DEL
8x			BPH	NBH		NEL	SSA	ESA	HTS	HTJ	VTS	PLD	PLU	RI	SS2	SS3
9x	DCS	PU1	PU2	STS	CCH	MW	SPA	EPA	SOS		SCI	CSI	ST	OSC	PM	APC
Ax																
Bx																
Cx																
Dx																
Ex																
Fx																
