= NBH =

NBH may refer to:

- No break here, a C1 control code used in computer systems that use ASCII and derivatives of ASCII, such as Unicode
- Non-breaking hyphen, a special variation of the hyphen character used in computer systems
- New Broadcasting House, the 2011 extension to the BBC Headquarters
