= X.64 =

X.64 may refer to:

- x86-64, a computer instruction set
- ANSI X3.64, a standard for escape sequences
