= Teletext character set =

Character set for Viewdata

This article covers technical details of the character encoding system defined by ETS 300 706 of the ETSI, a standard for World System Teletext, and used for the Viewdata and Teletext variants of Videotex in Europe.

== Character sets ==
The following tables show various Teletext character sets. Each character is shown with a potential Unicode equivalent if available. Space and control characters are represented by the abbreviations for their names.

=== Control characters ===
Control characters are used to set foreground and background color (black, red, green, yellow, blue, magenta, cyan, white, flash), character height (normal, double width, double height, double), current default character set, and other attributes.

In formats where compatibility with ECMA-48's C0 control codes such as TAB and LF is not required, these control codes are sometimes mapped transparently to the Unicode C0 control code range (U+0000 through U+001F). Amongst C1 control code sets, the ITU T.101 C1 control codes for "Serial" Data Syntax 2, are mostly a transposition of the Teletext spacing controls, except for the inclusion of CSI at 0x9B.

Teletext spacing attributes
	0	1	2	3	4	5	6	7	8	9	A	B	C	D	E	F
0x	ABK	ANR	ANG	ANY	ANB	ANM	ANC	ANW	FSH	STD	EBX	SBX	NSZ	DBH	DBW	DBS
1x	MBK	MSR	MSG	MSY	MSB	MSM	MSC	MSW	CDY	SPL (Note: The ETS 300 706 name of this control code is "Contiguous Mosaic Graphics", and it switches mosaic characters to contiguous (connected) display. Its other name of "Stop Lining" arises from other formats, as well as using it to switch mosaic characters to connected display, also using it to switch alphanumeric characters to non-underlined display.)	STL (Note: The ETS 300 706 name of this control code is "Separated Mosaic Graphics", and it switches mosaic characters to separated display. Its other name of "Start Lining" arises from other formats, as well as using it to switch mosaic characters to separated display, also using it to switch alphanumeric characters to underlined display.)	ESC (Note: ESC is also given the alternative name of "Switch" by ETS 300 706. It is used in certain contexts as a toggle between two G0 sets previously designated by dedicated packets.)	BBD	NBD	HMS	RMS

=== Latin ===
==== G0 ====
Teletext (Latin G0)
	0	1	2	3	4	5	6	7	8	9	A	B	C	D	E	F
2x	SP	!	"	#	¤	%	&	'	(	)	*	+	,	-	.	/
3x	0	1	2	3	4	5	6	7	8	9	:	;	<	=	>	?
4x	@	A	B	C	D	E	F	G	H	I	J	K	L	M	N	O
5x	P	Q	R	S	T	U	V	W	X	Y	Z	[	\	]		_
6x	`	a	b	c	d	e	f	g	h	i	j	k	l	m	n	o
7x	p	q	r	s	t	u	v	w	x	y	z	{	|	}	~	■

National option subset (see table below)

Latin G0 national option subsets
	23	24	40	5B	5C	5D	5E	5F	60	7B	7C	7D	7E
Primary set	#	¤	@	[	\	]		_	`	{	|	}	~
Czech/Slovak	#	ů	č	ť	ž	ý	í	ř	é	á	ě	ú	š
English	£	$	@	←	½	→	↑	#/⌗	─	¼	‖	¾	÷
Estonian	#	õ	Š	Ä	Ö	Ž	Ü	Õ	š	ä	ö	ž	ü
French	é	ï	à	ë	ê	ù	î	#	è	â	ô	û	ç
German	#	$	§	Ä	Ö	Ü		_	°	ä	ö	ü	ß
Italian	£	$	é	°	ç	→	↑	#	ù	à	ò	è	ì
Latvian/Lithuanian	#	$	Š	ė	ę	Ž	č	ū	š	ą	ų	ž	į
Polish	#	ń	ą	Ƶ	Ś	Ł	ć	ó	ę	ż	ś	ł	ź
Portuguese/Spanish	ç	$	¡	á	é	í	ó	ú	¿	ü	ñ	è	à
Romanian	#	¤	Ţ/Ț	Â	Ş/Ș	Ă	Î	ı	ţ/ț	â	ş/ș	ă	î
Serbian/Croatian/Slovenian	#	Ë	Č	Ć	Ž	Đ	Š	ë	č	ć	ž	đ	š
Swedish/Finnish/Hungarian	#	¤	É	Ä	Ö	Å	Ü	_	é	ä	ö	å	ü
Turkish	₺	ğ	İ	Ş	Ö	Ç	Ü	Ğ	ı	ş	ö	ç	ü

==== G2 ====
Teletext (Latin G2)
	0	1	2	3	4	5	6	7	8	9	A	B	C	D	E	F
2x	SP	¡	¢	£	$	¥	#	§	¤	‘	“	«	←	↑	→	↓
3x	°	±	²	³	×	µ	¶	·	÷	’	”	»	¼	½	¾	¿
4x	NBSP	̀	́	̂	̃	̄	̆	̇	̈	̣	̊	̧	̲	̋	̨	̌
5x	─	¹	®	©	™	♪	₠	‰	α				⅛	⅜	⅝	⅞
6x	Ω	Æ	Ð	ª	Ħ		Ĳ	Ŀ	Ł	Ø	Œ	º	Þ	Ŧ	Ŋ	ŉ
7x	ĸ	æ	đ	ð	ħ	ı	ĳ	ŀ	ł	ø	œ	ß	þ	ŧ	ŋ	■

Diacritical marks for use with G0 characters

=== Greek ===
==== G0 ====
Teletext (Greek G0)
	0	1	2	3	4	5	6	7	8	9	A	B	C	D	E	F
2x	SP	!	"	#	$	%	&	'	(	)	*	+	,	-	.	/
3x	0	1	2	3	4	5	6	7	8	9	:	;	«	=	»	?
4x	ΐ	Α	Β	Γ	Δ	Ε	Ζ	Η	Θ	Ι	Κ	Λ	Μ	Ν	Ξ	Ο
5x	Π	Ρ	ʹ	Σ	Τ	Υ	Φ	Χ	Ψ	Ω	Ϊ	Ϋ	ά	έ	ή	ί
6x	ΰ	α	β	γ	δ	ε	ζ	η	θ	ι	κ	λ	μ	ν	ξ	ο
7x	π	ρ	ς	σ	τ	υ	φ	χ	ψ	ω	ϊ	ϋ	ό	ύ	ώ	■

==== G2 ====
Teletext (Greek G2)
	0	1	2	3	4	5	6	7	8	9	A	B	C	D	E	F
2x	SP	a	b	£	e	h	i	§	:	‘	“	k	←	↑	→	↓
3x	°	±	²	³	×	m	n	p	÷	’	”	t	¼	½	¾	x
4x		̀	́	̂	̃	̄	̆	̇	̈	̣	̊	̧	̲	̋	̨	̌
5x	?	¹	®	©	™	♪	₠	‰	ɑ	Ί	Ύ	Ώ	⅛	⅜	⅝	⅞
6x	C	D	F	G	J	L	Q	R	S	U	V	W	Y	Z	Ά	Ή
7x	c	d	f	g	j	l	q	r	s	u	v	w	y	z	Έ	■

Diacritical marks for use with G0 characters

=== Cyrillic ===
==== G0 ====
Teletext (Cyrillic G0, Russian/Bulgarian)
	0	1	2	3	4	5	6	7	8	9	A	B	C	D	E	F
2x	SP	!	"	#	$	%	ы	'	(	)	*	+	,	-	.	/
3x	0	1	2	3	4	5	6	7	8	9	:	;	<	=	>	?
4x	Ю	А	Б	Ц	Д	Е	Ф	Г	Х	И	Ѝ	К	Л	М	Н	О
5x	П	Я	Р	С	Т	У	Ж	В	Ь	Ъ	З	Ш	Э	Щ	Ч	Ы
6x	ю	а	б	ц	д	е	ф	г	х	и	ѝ	к	л	м	н	о
7x	п	я	р	с	т	у	ж	в	ь	ъ	з	ш	э	щ	ч	■

Teletext (Cyrillic G0, Serbian/Croatian)
	0	1	2	3	4	5	6	7	8	9	A	B	C	D	E	F
2x	SP	!	"	#	$	%	&	'	(	)	*	+	,	-	.	/
3x	0	1	2	3	4	5	6	7	8	9	:	;	<	=	>	?
4x	Ч	А	Б	Ц	Д	Е	Ф	Г	Х	И	Ј	К	Л	М	Н	О
5x	П	Ќ	Р	С	Т	У	В	Ѓ	Љ	Њ	З	Ћ	Ж	Ђ	Ш	Џ
6x	ч	а	б	ц	д	е	ф	г	х	и	ј	к	л	м	н	о
7x	п	ќ	р	с	т	у	в	ѓ	љ	њ	з	ћ	ж	ђ	ш	■

Teletext (Cyrillic G0, Ukrainian)
	0	1	2	3	4	5	6	7	8	9	A	B	C	D	E	F
2x	SP	!	"	#	$	%	ї	'	(	)	*	+	,	-	.	/
3x	0	1	2	3	4	5	6	7	8	9	:	;	<	=	>	?
4x	Ю	А	Б	Ц	Д	Е	Ф	Г	Х	И	Ѝ	К	Л	М	Н	О
5x	П	Я	Р	С	Т	У	Ж	В	Ь	І	З	Ш	Є	Щ	Ч	Ї
6x	ю	а	б	ц	д	е	ф	г	х	и	ѝ	к	л	м	н	о
7x	п	я	р	с	т	у	ж	в	ь	і	з	ш	є	щ	ч	■

==== G2 ====
Teletext (Cyrillic G2)
	0	1	2	3	4	5	6	7	8	9	A	B	C	D	E	F
2x	SP	¡	¢	£	$	¥		§		‘	“	«	←	↑	→	↓
3x	°	±	²	³	×	µ	¶	·	÷	’	”	»	¼	½	¾	¿
4x		̀	́	̂	̃	̄	̆	̇	̈	̣	̊	̧	̲	̋	̨	̌
5x	—	¹	®	©	™	♪	₠	‰	α	Ł	ł	β	⅛	⅜	⅝	⅞
6x	D	E	F	G	I	J	K	L	N	Q	R	S	U	V	W	Z
7x	d	e	f	g	i	j	k	l	n	q	r	s	u	v	w	z

Diacritical marks for use with G0 characters

=== Arabic ===
Note that each Arabic contextual/positional character in the tables below is shown with the non-positional Unicode equivalent if available.

==== G0 ====
Teletext (Arabic G0)
	0	1	2	3	4	5	6	7	8	9	A	B	C	D	E	F
2x	SP	!	"	£	$	%	�	ﻱ	)	(	*	+	,	-	.	/
3x	0	1	2	3	4	5	6	7	8	9	:	؛	>	=	<	؟
4x	ﺔ	ﺀ	ﺒ	ﺏ	ﺘ	ﺕ	ﺎ	ﺍ	ﺑ	ﺓ	ﺗ	ﺛ	ﺟ	ﺣ	ﺧ	ﺩ
5x	ﺫ	ﺭ	ﺯ	ﺳ	ﺷ	ﺻ	ﺿ	ﻃ	ﻇ	ﻋ	ﻏ	ﺜ	ﺠ	ﺤ	ﺨ	#
6x	ـ	ﻓ	ﻗ	ﻛ	ﻟ	ﻣ	ﻧ	ﻫ	ﻭ	ﻰ	ﻳ	ﺙ	ﺝ	ﺡ	ﺥ	ﻴ
7x	ﻯ	ﻌ	ﻐ	ﻔ	ﻑ	ﻘ	ﻕ	ﻙ	ﻠ	ﻝ	ﻤ	ﻡ	ﻨ	ﻥ	ﻻ	■

==== G2 ====
Teletext (Arabic G2)
	0	1	2	3	4	5	6	7	8	9	A	B	C	D	E	F
2x	SP	ﻉ	ﺁ	ﺃ	ﺅ	ﺇ	ﺋ	ﺊ	ﭼ	ﭽ	ﭺ	ﭘ	ﭙ	ﭖ	ﮊ	ﮔ
3x	٠	١	٢	٣	٤	٥	٦	٧	٨	٩	ﻎ	ﻍ	ﻼ	ﻬ	ﻪ	ﻩ
4x	à	A	B	C	D	E	F	G	H	I	J	K	L	M	N	O
5x	P	Q	R	S	T	U	V	W	X	Y	Z	ë	ê	ù	î	ﻊ
6x	é	a	b	c	d	e	f	g	h	i	j	k	l	m	n	o
7x	p	q	r	s	t	u	v	w	x	y	z	â	ô	û	ç	■

=== Hebrew ===
Teletext (Hebrew G0)
	0	1	2	3	4	5	6	7	8	9	A	B	C	D	E	F
2x	SP	!	"	£	$	%	&	'	(	)	*	+	,	-	.	/
3x	0	1	2	3	4	5	6	7	8	9	:	;	<	=	>	?
4x	@	A	B	C	D	E	F	G	H	I	J	K	L	M	N	O
5x	P	Q	R	S	T	U	V	W	X	Y	Z	←	½	→	↑	#
6x	א	ב	ג	ד	ה	ו	ז	ח	ט	י	ך	כ	ל	ם	מ	ן
7x	נ	ס	ע	ף	פ	ץ	צ	ק	ר	ש	ת	₪	‖	¾	÷	■

=== Graphics character sets ===
==== G1 block mosaics ====
Teletext (G1)
	0	1	2	3	4	5	6	7	8	9	A	B	C	D	E	F
2x	SP	🬀	🬁	🬂	🬃	🬄	🬅	🬆	🬇	🬈	🬉	🬊	🬋	🬌	🬍	🬎
3x	🬏	🬐	🬑	🬒	🬓	▌	🬔	🬕	🬖	🬗	🬘	🬙	🬚	🬛	🬜	🬝
4x																
5x																
6x	🬞	🬟	🬠	🬡	🬢	🬣	🬤	🬥	🬦	🬧	▐	🬨	🬩	🬪	🬫	🬬
7x	🬭	🬮	🬯	🬰	🬱	🬲	🬳	🬴	🬵	🬶	🬷	🬸	🬹	🬺	🬻	█

Same table as above, rendered with bitmaps:

	0	1	2	3	4	5	6	7	8	9	A	B	C	D	E	F
2	NBSP	🬀	🬁	🬂	🬃	🬄	🬅	🬆	🬇	🬈	🬉	🬊	🬋	🬌	🬍	🬎
3	🬏	🬐	🬑	🬒	🬓	▌	🬔	🬕	🬖	🬗	🬘	🬙	🬚	🬛	🬜	🬝
6	🬞	🬟	🬠	🬡	🬢	🬣	🬤	🬥	🬦	🬧	▐	🬨	🬩	🬪	🬫	🬬
7	🬭	🬮	🬯	🬰	🬱	🬲	🬳	🬴	🬵	🬶	🬷	🬸	🬹	🬺	🬻	█

==== G3 smooth mosaics and line drawing ====
Teletext (G3)
	0	1	2	3	4	5	6	7	8	9	A	B	C	D	E	F
2x	🬼	🬽	🬾	🬿	🭀	◣	🭁	🭂	🭃	🭄	🭅	🭆	🭨	🭩	🭰	▒
3x	🭇	🭈	🭉	🭊	🭋	◢	🭌	🭍	🭎	🭏	🭐	🭑	🭪	🭫	🭵	█
4x	┷	┯	┝	┥	🮤	🮥	🮦	🮧	🮠	🮡	🮢	🮣	┿	•	●	○
5x	│	─	┌	┐	└	┘	├	┤	┬	┴	┼	⭢	⭠	⭡	⭣	NBSP
6x	🭒	🭓	🭔	🭕	🭖	◥	🭗	🭘	🭙	🭚	🭛	🭜	🭬	🭭		
7x	🭝	🭞	🭟	🭠	🭡	◤	🭢	🭣	🭤	🭥	🭦	🭧	🭮	🭯		

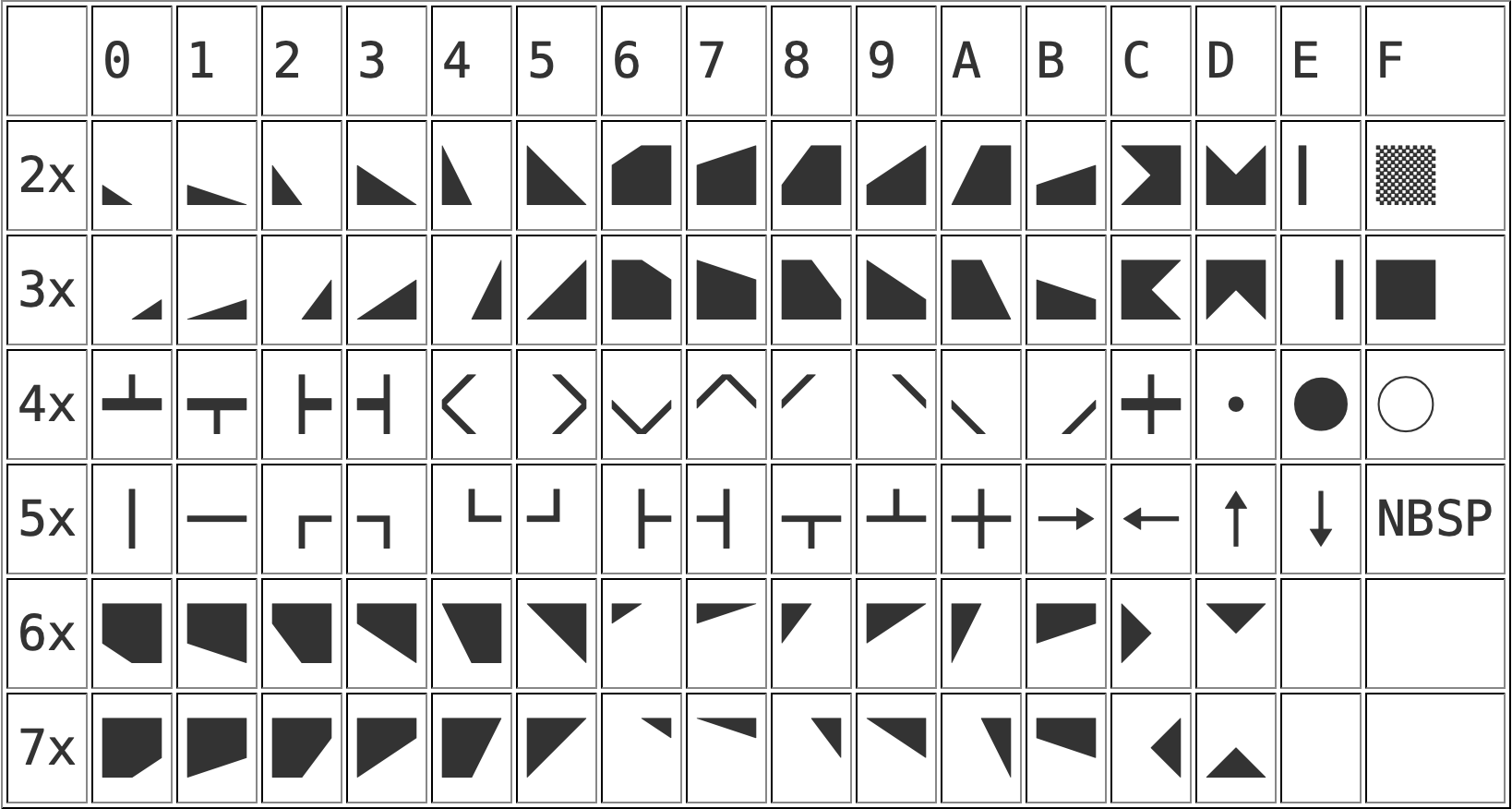
Same table as above, as an image:
