= ISO 1745 =

International standard

ISO 1745:1975 Information processing – Basic mode control procedures for data communication systems is an early ISO standard defining a Telex-oriented communications protocol that used the non-printable ASCII transmission control characters SOH (Start of Heading), STX (Start of Text), ETX (End of Text), EOT (End of Transmission), ENQ (Enquiry), ACK (Acknowledge), DLE (Data Link Escape), NAK (Negative Acknowledge), SYN (Synchronous Idle), and ETB (End of Transmission Block).

It also defines a serial data format, consisting of a start bit, 7 bit ASCII (least significant bit first), a parity bit (even for asynchronous networks, odd for synchronous networks), and a stop bit.

The text of ISO 1745:1975 is not currently freely available, but the corresponding ECMA version is. The protocol it defines seems to now be little used.
