= ConEmu =

Tabbed terminal emulator for Windows

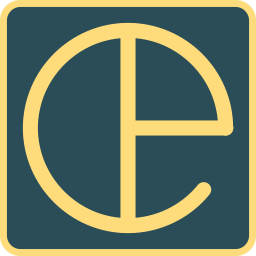

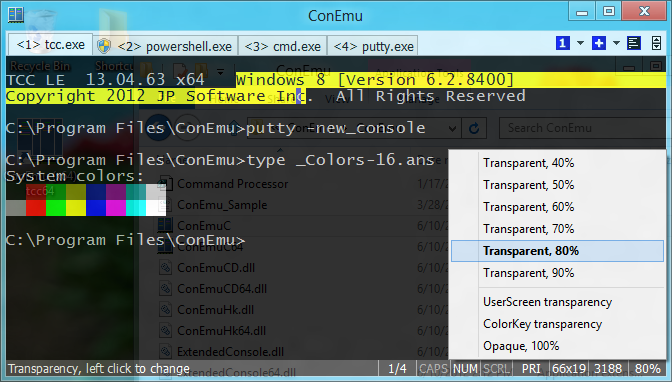
- Developers: Zoin (2006–2008); Maximus5 (2009–2017)
- Release: March 9, 2007; 19 years ago
- Written in: C++
- Operating system: Microsoft Windows
- Available in: Chinese, English, German, Japan, Russian, Spanish
- Type: Terminal emulator
- License: BSD-3-Clause
- Website: conemu.github.io
- Repository: github.com/Maximus5/ConEmu

ConEmu (short for Console emulator) is a free and open-source tabbed terminal emulator for Windows. ConEmu presents multiple consoles and simple GUI applications as one customizable GUI window with tabs and a status bar. It also provides emulation for ANSI escape codes for color, bypassing the capabilities of the standard Windows Console Host to provide 256 and 24-bit color in Windows.

The program has a large range of customization, including custom color palettes for the standard 16 colors, hotkeys, transparency, an auto-hideable mode (similar to the way Quake originally displayed its developer console).

Initially, the program was created as a companion to Far Manager, bringing some features common to graphical file managers to this console application (thumbnails and tiles, drag and drop with other windows, true color interface, and others). As of 2012, ConEmu could be used with any other Win32 console application or simple GUI tool (such as Notepad, PuTTY or DOSBox). ConEmu doesn't provide any shell itself, but rather allows using any other shell. It does provide a limited macro language, to control the hosted applications startup.
