= Terminator (terminal emulator) =

Open-source terminal emulator in Java

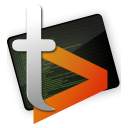

- Terminator on Mac OS X showing live search highlighting and UTF-8 capabilities, courtesy of Markus Kuhn's UTF-8-demo.txt and cat.
- Developer(s): Phil Norman, Elliott Hughes, Martin Dorey
- Stable release: Revision #1418 (2523) / February 24, 2008; 17 years ago
- Written in: Java
- Operating system: Windows/X Window System
- Type: Terminal emulator
- License: GPL-2.0-or-later
- Website: github.com/software-jessies-org/jessies/wiki/Terminator

Terminator is an open-source terminal emulator programmed in Java. It is available on Microsoft Windows, macOS, Linux and other Unix systems that use the X Window System. Terminator will run on any modern POSIX system running Java 6 or later. Terminator is licensed under the GPL-2.0-or-later license.

Terminator was originally written by Phil Norman, who produced a more-or-less usable replacement for rxvt on his own between 21 April 2004 and 28 May 2004; roughly a month of development time. Elliott Hughes took Phil's terminal emulation and used it as a base upon which he could experiment with advanced terminal emulator features and continues to actively develop Terminator. Martin Dorey ported Terminator to Cygwin.

== Features ==
- Automatic Logging - Complete logs are automatically generated of all of the user's terminal sessions.
- Drag & Drop - Text, URLs, and files from GUI file managers can be dropped on Terminator to be inserted as text, with automatic quoting of filenames containing shell meta-characters.
- Find - Terminator provides you with a find function, so users can search for text and regular expressions within their terminal (including the scrollback) in the style of less, and offering quick movement to the next or previous match.
- Horizontal Scrolling - Most terminal emulators wrap text when it intrudes upon the right margin. Terminator instead provides a horizontal scrollbar when necessary.
- Multiple Tabs - Like tabbed browsing.
- Number Reinterpretation - Terminator will recognize numbers in a variety of bases as the current selection, and add informational menu items to the pop-up menu showing the same number in other bases. No more man ascii or resorting to bc.
- Portability - Written mostly in Java, with a small POSIX C++ part (for pseudo-terminal support) and a Ruby invocation script, Terminator should compile out of the box on most modern desktop operating systems.
- Tab Character Handling - Many terminal emulators translate tab characters into strings of spaces. If a section of text is then copied or pasted from the terminal into a text editor, it appears as spaces rather than tabs; Terminator remembers them as tab characters.
- Unlimited Scrollback - Terminator does not throw away output when it scrolls off the top of the screen, nor when it reaches any arbitrary limit. The user must manually clear the scrollback.
- Intelligent Vertical Scrolling - Terminator's scrollbar won't keep jumping when there's output if you've deliberately scrolled back to look at part of the history, but as soon as you scroll back to the bottom again, it will resume auto-scrolling.
- Safe Quit - Terminator knows when you still have processes running, and brings up a dialog rather than just letting those processes die.
- UTF-8 - Terminator does not mangle accented characters, and it copes well with languages such as Greek where there's a mix of normal and wide glyphs.

== See also ==
- PuTTY
