= Kitty (terminal emulator) =

Terminal emulator

kitty
- Original author: Kovid Goyal
- Initial release: 2017
- Stable release: 0.46.2 / 21 March 2026; 34 days ago
- Written in: C, Python, Go
- Operating system: Linux, macOS, FreeBSD
- License: GNU General Public License, version 3.0
- Website: sw.kovidgoyal.net/kitty/
- Repository: github.com/kovidgoyal/kitty

kitty is a free and open-source GPU-accelerated terminal emulator for Linux, macOS, and some BSD distributions. It is written in a mix of C, Python and Go programming languages. kitty shares its name with another program — KiTTY — a fork of PuTTY for Microsoft Windows.

== Features ==
Kitty supports supplemental programs called kittens that add features to kitty. Other features include:

- Display images with ImageMagick installed
- Interactive Unicode characters input by name, code, recently used
- Supports true color, text formatting features
- Tiling of multiple windows and tabs
- Single config file
- Hyperlink clicks
- Mouse support (for example in Vim)
- Multiple copy/paste buffers like in Vim
- OpenGL rendering
