= DIN 43700 =

DIN 43700 was the specification by the Deutsches Institut für Normung for nominal front- and cut-out dimensions of measurement and control instruments for panel mounting. It was superseded by DIN IEC 61554.

Spec	Cutout size
1/2 DIN	192 mm × 96 mm (7.65" × 3.78")
1/4 DIN	96 mm × 96 mm (3.78" × 3.78")
1/8 DIN	96 mm × 48 mm (3.78" × 1.89")
1/16 DIN	48 mm × 48 mm (1.89" × 1.89")
1/32 DIN	24 mm × 48 mm (0.95" × 1.89")

== See also ==
- List of DIN standards
- ISO 7736
