= DIN 7876 =

German standard for manufacture of swimfins

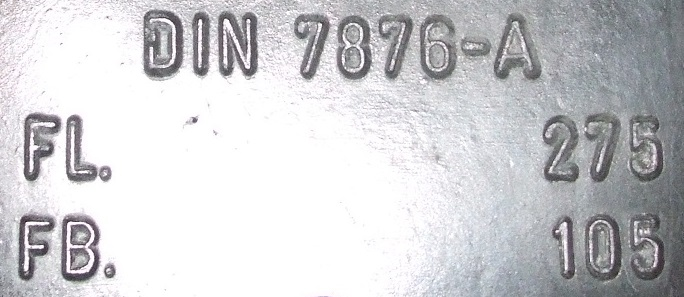
Swimming fin sole marked to show compliance with German standard DIN 7876.

DIN 7876 is a German standard specifying how swimming fins should be dimensioned, tested and marked for conformity. In 1980, the Deutsches Institut für Normung (DIN) published consecutively numbered German standards DIN 7876, DIN 7877 and DIN 7878 dedicated respectively to the swimming fin, the diving mask and the breathing tube, which constitute basic underwater diving equipment. DIN 7876 of October 1980 is entitled Tauch-Zubehör – Schwimmflossen – Maße, Anforderungen und Prüfung in German and subtitled “Diving accessories for skin divers; Flippers, dimensions, requirements and testing” in English. This standard establishes certain quantitative and qualitative specifications for swimming fins, with particular reference to foot pockets and heel straps. Swimming fin manufacturers fulfilling such requirements may mark their products as compliant with this standard. The status of DIN 7876 is currently zurückgezogen, meaning: “withdrawn”.

== Chronology ==
DIN 7876 is the third of the seven known military, national and international standards on swimming fins listed below in order of publication:

- 1965. United States military standard MIL-S-82258. Military specification. Swim fins, rubber.
- 1977. USSR/CIS standard GOST 22469. Ласты резиновые для плавания. Общие технические условия. Swimming rubber flippers. General specifications.
- 1980. German standard DIN 7876. Tauchzubehör. Schwimmflossen. Maße, Anforderungen und Prüfung. Diving accessories for skin divers. Flippers. Dimensions, requirements and testing.
- 1982. Polish Industry Standard BN-82/8444-17.02. Gumowy sprzęt pływacki — Płetwy pływackie (Rubber swimming equipment — Swimming fins).
- 1985. Malaysian standard MS 974. Specification for rubber swimming fins. 2002. First revision.
- 1988. Austrian standard ÖNORM S 4224. Tauch-Zubehör; Schwimmflossen; Abmessungen, sicherheitstechnische Anforderungen, Prüfung, Normkennzeichnung. Diving accessories; fins; dimensions, safety requirements, testing, marking of conformity.
- 2015. European standard EN 16804. Diving equipment. Diving open heel fins. Requirements and test methods.

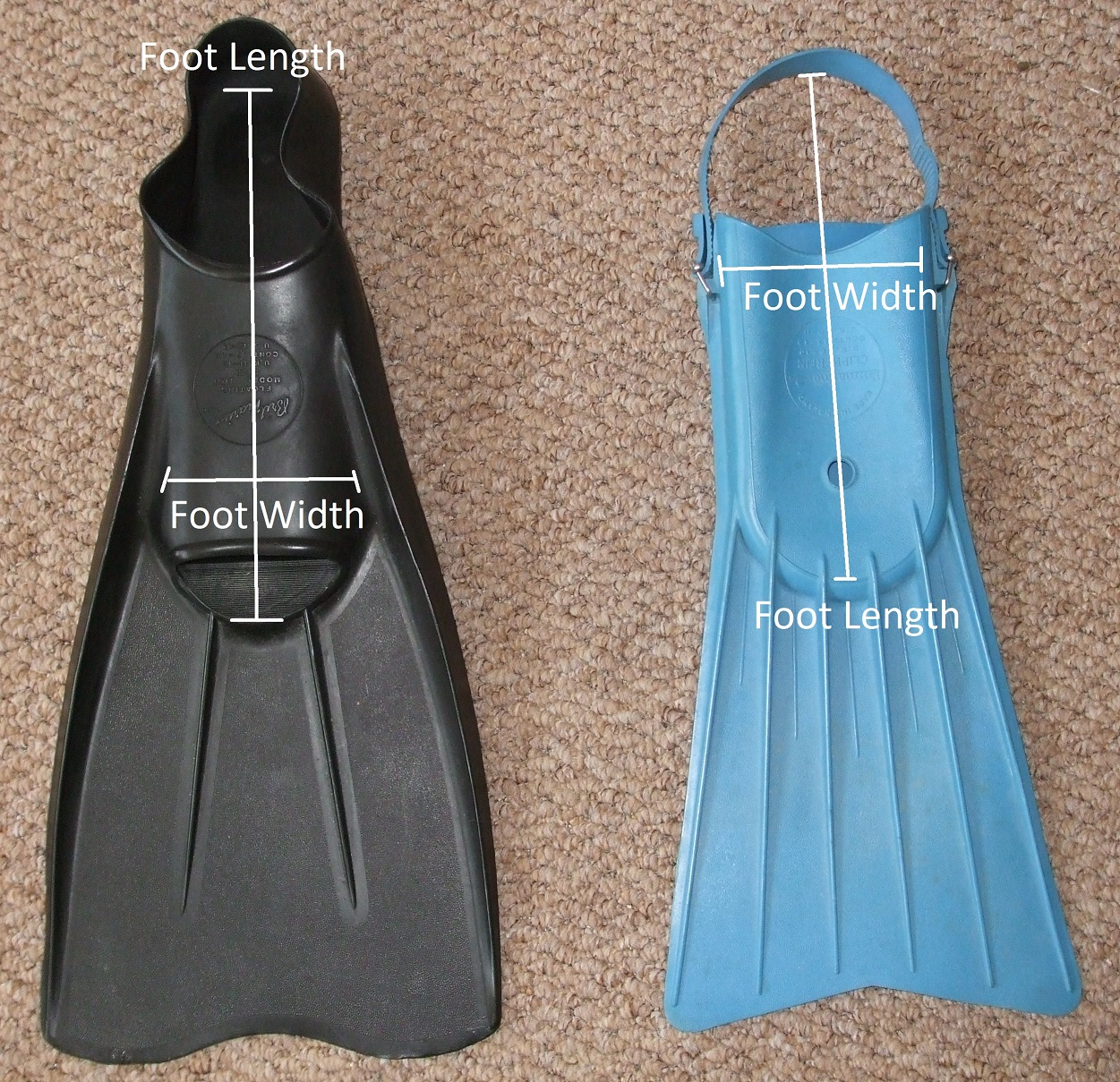
Full-foot and open-heel fin footspace length and width measurements.

== Purpose ==
DIN 7876 may be applied to all full-foot and open-heel fin models made from either rubber or plastic, but the standard excludes long-bladed fins for competitive use. In the interests of health and safety, this standard stipulates that no protruding edges should be in evidence at any point of contact between the fins and the feet. If heel straps are present, they should be adjustable and retain their settings when wet. A 10-minute pull test is prescribed to confirm this requirement.

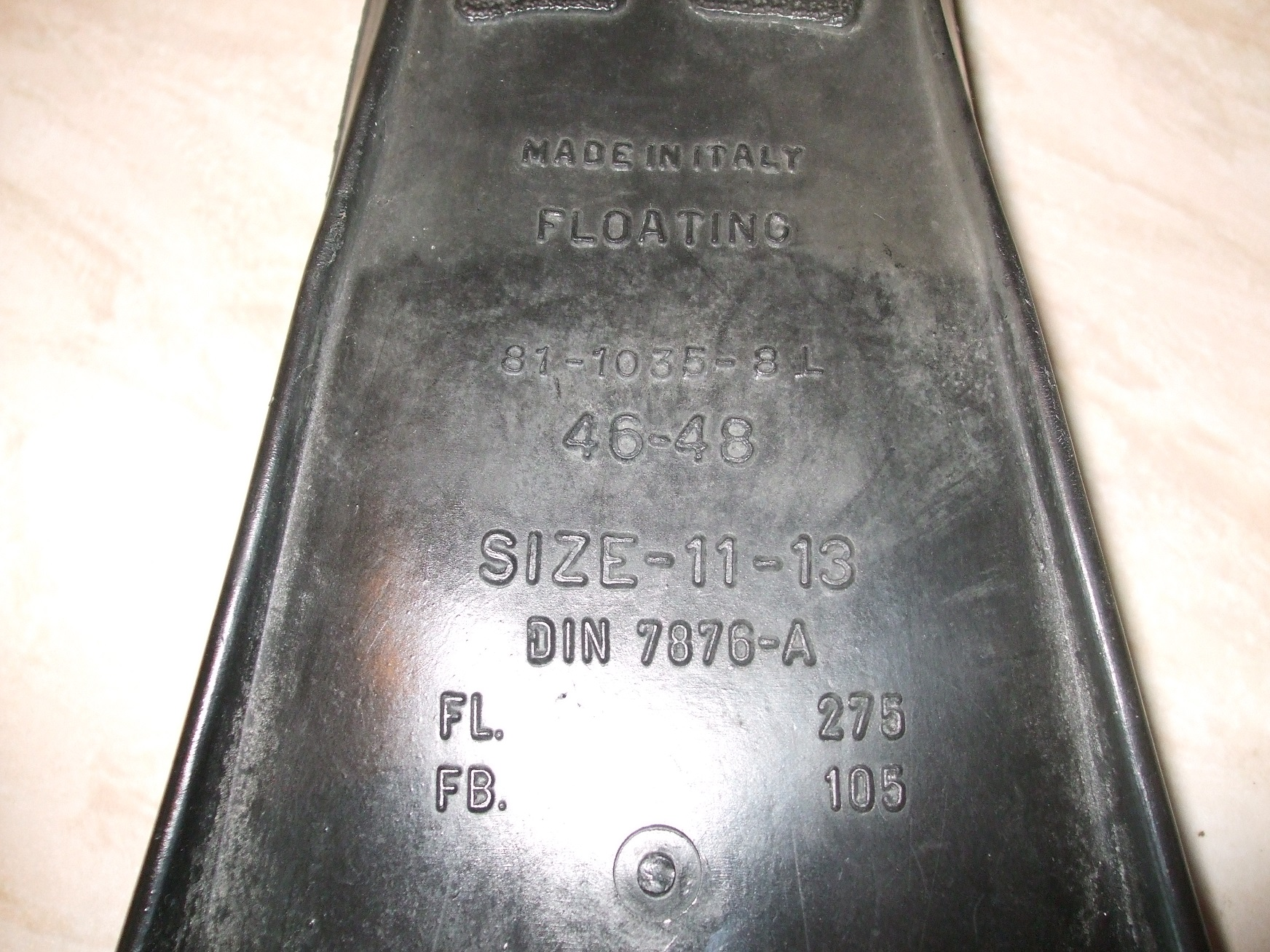
Marina Delfino swimming fin embossed on the sole with details prescribed by German standard DIN 7876.

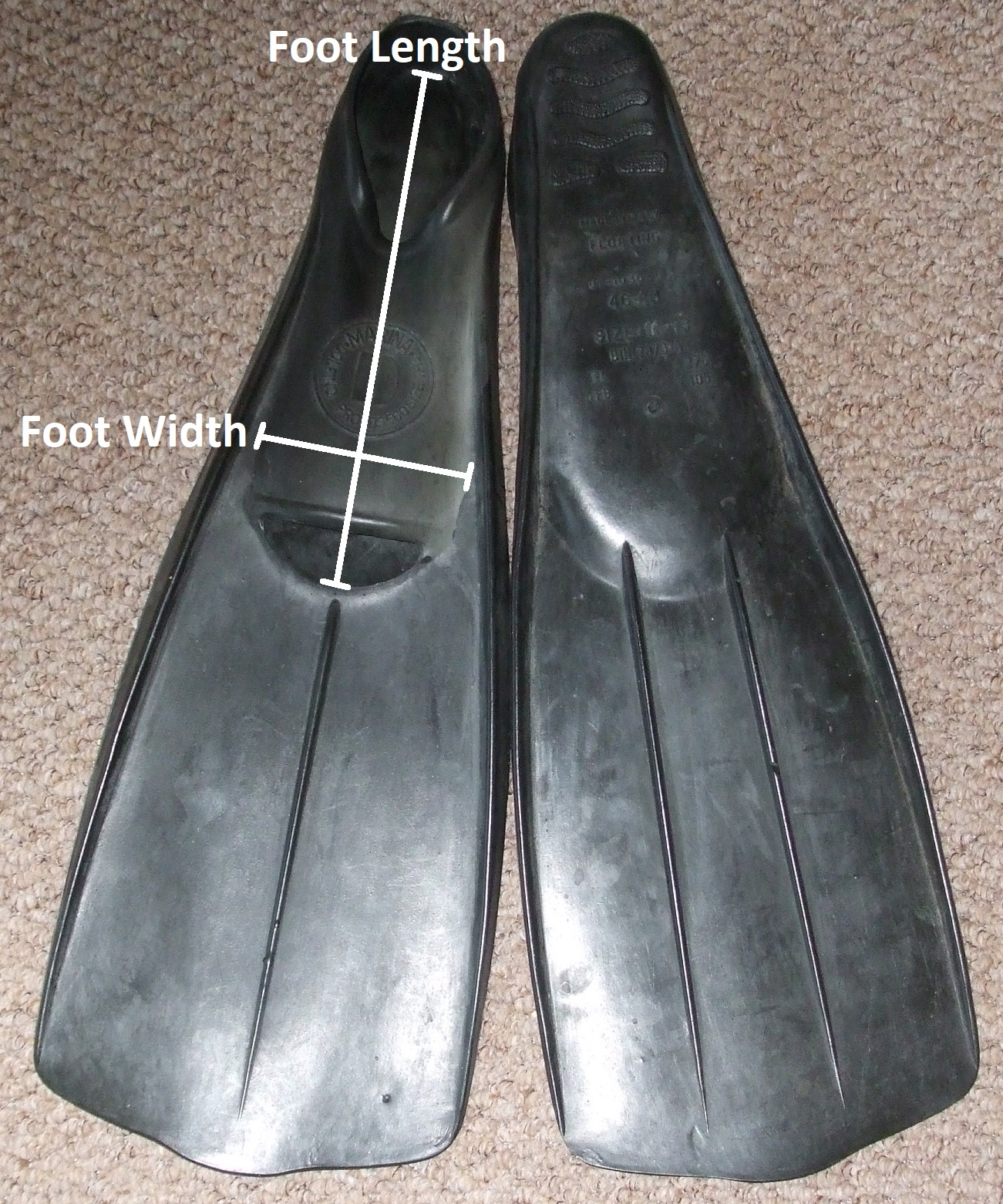
Marina Delfino full-foot fins showing how foot length and foot width are measured.

== Dimensions ==
The bulk of DIN 7876 is devoted to the dimensions of the footspaces of full-foot and open-heel fins. A full-foot fin is designated as a "Form A" fin, while an open-heel fin is designated as a "Form B" fin, which coincides with fin nomenclature in the earlier 1977 USSR and CIS Standard GOST 22469—77 entitled Ласты резиновые для плавания. Общие технические условия in Russian and subtitled "Swimming rubber flippers. General specifications" in English.

The key footspace measurements required by DIN 7876 are the inner length "FL" (Fußlänge or Foot Length) at the longest dimension and the inner width "FB" (Fußbreite or Foot Width) at the widest point. The standard provides a table, based on the Mondopoint shoe-sizing system, with a range of recommended foot widths for each foot length in millimetres.

== Marking ==
DIN 7876 requires any fins complying with its specifications to be marked with their footspace length (FL) and width (FB) in millimetres as well as the name or symbol of their manufacturer, distributor or importer. This practice is illustrated here in the image of the sole of a European size 46-48 full-foot fin made in Italy during the 1980s. "DIN 7876-A" identifies this product as a German Standard DIN 7876 compliant full-foot fin (a.k.a. Form A), whose footspace measures 275 mm in length (FL) at the longest dimension and 105 mm in width (FB) at the widest point with a tolerance of ±2 mm.

== Usage ==
For reasons of economy, swimming fins are traditionally sized to accommodate a range of several shoe sizes. The upshot is that a model labelled with a 46-48 size range risks being a loose fit on a size 46 foot and a tight fit on a size 48 foot. A loose-fitting fin is liable to slip off in heavy surf, while a tight-fitting fin is likely to cause foot cramping, both potentially disastrous consequences if the user is far from the shore. A DIN 7876 compliant fin comes embossed with the length and width of its footspace in millimetres, enabling the purchaser to make a more precise match between the fin and the foot.

References to DIN 7876 can be found in the literature of underwater diving and in the publications of the German Life Saving Association and the German Red Cross. In a 1994 circular, the French Ministry of Education cited the standard when setting selection criteria for water sports equipment to be used by children between the ages of 4 and 12.

Although DIN 7876 is now officially in abeyance, its legacy survives within the normative documentation of other standardisation bodies. Austrian standard ÖNORM S 4224 of 1988 entitled "Tauch-Zubehör; Schwimmflossen; Abmessungen, sicherheitstechnische Anforderungen, Prüfung, Normkennzeichnung" in German and subtitled "Diving accessories; fins; dimensions, safety requirements, testing, marking of conformity" in English, closely resembles DIN 7876 in content. DIN 7876 foot-pocket and heel-strap dimensioning provisions remain in force within Malaysian standard MS 974 entitled "Specification for rubber swimming fins", published in 1985 and revised in 2002. European standard EN 16804 entitled "Diving equipment — Diving open-heel fins — Requirements and test methods" and published in 2015 emulates DIN 7876 in requiring the heel strap to be pull-tested for slippage and the footspace to be free of sharp edges that may cause injury.

== See also ==
- List of DIN standards
- Standardization – Implementation of technical standards based on the consensus of different parties
- Footwear – Garments worn on feet
