= DIN 47100 =

Standard regulating color-coding for telecom cables

DIN Standard DIN 47100 regulated the color-coding for the identification of cores in telecommunication cables. The standard was withdrawn without a replacement in November 1998, but remains in widespread use by cable manufacturers.

The isolations of the several wires in a cable are either solidly colored in one color, or striped lengthwise in two colors. Use of the three-colored wires numbered 45 and up is rare.

Cable identification to DIN 47100
Number	Color	Short form	Number	Color	Short form
1	white	WH	31	green-blue	GNBU
2	brown	BN	32	yellow-blue	YEBU
3	green	GN	33	green-red	GNRD
4	yellow	YE	34	yellow-red	YERD
5	grey	GY	35	green-black	GNBK
6	pink	PK	36	yellow-black	YEBK
7	blue	BU	37	grey-blue	GYBU
8	red	RD	38	pink-blue	PKBU
9	black	BK	39	grey-red	GYRD
10	violet	VT	40	pink-red	PKRD
11	grey-pink	GYPK	41	grey-black	GYBK
12	red-blue	RDBU	42	pink-black	PKBK
13	white-green	WHGN	43	blue-black	BUBK
14	brown-green	BNGN	44	red-black	RDBK
15	white-yellow	WHYE	45	white-brown-black	WHBNBK
16	yellow-brown	YEBN	46	yellow-green-black	YEGNBK
17	white-grey	WHGY	47	grey-pink-black	GYPKBK
18	grey-brown	GYBN	48	red-blue-black	RDBUBK
19	white-pink	WHPK	49	white-green-black	WHGNBK
20	pink-brown	PKBN	50	brown-green-black	BNGNBK
21	white-blue	WHBU	51	white-yellow-black	WHYEBK
22	brown-blue	BNBU	52	yellow-brown-black	YEBNBK
23	white-red	WHRD	53	white-grey-black	WHGYBK
24	brown-red	BNRD	54	grey-brown-black	GYBNBK
25	white-black	WHBK	55	white-pink-black	WHPKBK
26	brown-black	BNBK	56	pink-brown-black	PKBNBK
27	grey-green	GYGN	57	white-blue-black	WHBUBK
28	yellow-grey	YEGY	58	brown-blue-black	BNBUBK
29	pink-green	PKGN	59	white-red-black	WHRDBK
30	yellow-pink	YEPK	60	brown-red-black	BNRDBK

== See also ==
- 25-pair color code
