= PEARL (programming language) =

High-level language

PEARL, or Process and experiment automation realtime language, is a computer programming language designed for multitasking and real-time programming. Being a high-level language, it is fairly cross-platform. Since 1977, the language has undergone several standardization iterations by the Deutsches Institut für Normung. The current version is PEARL-90, which was standardized in 1998 as DIN 66253-2.

== Features ==
PEARL supports both fixed-point and floating-point numeric values, character and character string data as well as bit values. It also provides facilities for structures and multi-dimensional arrays. Both typed and untyped pointers are also supported, along with typecasting.

PEARL is a higher level programming language, which allows comfortable, secure and almost processor independent programming of multitasking and realtime solutions. It has been standardized since 1977 at various stages of its development. The last time was in 1998 as PEARL-90 (DIN 66253-2 1998, Berlin, Beuth-Verlag, 1998).

Besides the simple possibility to map process technical problems, an important principle in the development of PEARL was ease of learning by the programmer.

All basic data types and language structures of other procedural programming languages exist in PEARL. In addition PEARL offers comfortable language elements for the handling of multitasking- and realtime tasks.

Like most other high-level languages, PEARL supports procedures and functions, and passing parameters to these can be done by value or by reference (via pointers).

=== Example ===
MODULE (HELLOWORLD);
   SYSTEM;
       TERMINAL:DIS<->SDVLS(2);
 
   PROBLEM;
       SPC TERMINAL DATION INOUT ALPHIC DIM(,) TFU MAX FORWARD CONTROL (ALL);
 
   MAIN:TASK;
      OPEN TERMINAL;
      PUT 'Hello World!' TO TERMINAL;
      CLOSE TERMINAL;
   END;
 
MODEND;
