= DIN 1530 =

German industrial standard

DIN 1530 is a standard by the German Institute for Standardization for ejector pins used in injection moulds. Ejector pins are used to eject plastic or alloyed products from the mould after solidification.

The standard has three parts:

- DIN 1530-1: Tools for moulding - Part 1: Ejector pins with cylindrical head
- DIN 1530-2: Tools for moulding - Part 2: Shouldered ejector pins
- DIN 1530-3: Tools for moulding - Part 3: Ejector pins with conical head
