= DIN 66303 =

German national character encoding standard related to ISO 8859

- DIN: 66303
- Area: Character Encoding
- Title: Information Technology; 8-Bit-Code
- Summary: Character set standard for character encoding in computer systems
- Last output: 2000-06
- ISO: 8859-1

The German standard DIN 66303 is a character set standard, which is used for character encoding in computer systems. The standard DIN 66303 bears the title "Information Technology: 8-Bit-Code" and was established in November 1986 (DIN 66303:1986-11). The most recent edition is from June 2000 (DIN 66303:2000-06).

The character set of the 2000 edition (DIN 66303:2000-06) corresponds in layout and repertoire to the international standard ISO/IEC 8859-1. The still often-used forerunner DIN 66303:1986-11 specified two code pages, the General Reference Version of the 8-Bit-Code (German: Allgemeine Referenz-Version, ARV8) and the German Reference Version of the 8-Bit-Code (German: Deutsche Referenz-Version, DRV8).

DRV8 is an extension of DIN 66003 (the German adaptation of ISO/IEC 646) with European characters, whereas ARV8 represents a re-arrangement of the DIN 66003 characters to their internationally used (ISO-8859-1 or DEC MCS) code points.

== Tables for the 1986 edition ==
=== DIN 66303:1986-11 – German Reference Version of the 8-bit Code (DRV8) ===
DRV8
- Standard: DIN 66303:1986-11
- Classification: Extended ISO 646
- Extends: DIN 66003
- Transforms / Encodes: ISO-8859-1
- Succeeded by: DIN 66303:2000-06 (ISO-8859-1)

The DRV8 code corresponds to ISO-8859-1 with certain characters swapped, such as to make it an extension of DIN 66003 as opposed to of ASCII.

German Reference Version of the 8-bit Code (DRV8)
	0	1	2	3	4	5	6	7	8	9	A	B	C	D	E	F
0x	NUL	SOH	STX	ETX	EOT	ENQ	ACK	BEL	BS	HT	LF	VT	FF	CR	SO	SI
1x	DLE	DC1	DC2	DC3	DC4	NAK	SYN	ETB	CAN	EM	SUB	ESC	FS	GS	RS	US
2x	SP	!	"	#	$	%	&	'	(	)	*	+	,	-	.	/
3x	0	1	2	3	4	5	6	7	8	9	:	;	<	=	>	?
4x	§	A	B	C	D	E	F	G	H	I	J	K	L	M	N	O
5x	P	Q	R	S	T	U	V	W	X	Y	Z	Ä	Ö	Ü		_
6x	`	a	b	c	d	e	f	g	h	i	j	k	l	m	n	o
7x	p	q	r	s	t	u	v	w	x	y	z	ä	ö	ü	ß	DEL
8x																
9x																
Ax	NBSP	¡	¢	£	¤	¥	¦	@	¨	©	ª	«	¬	SHY	®	¯
Bx	°	±	²	³	´	µ	¶	·	¸	¹	º	»	¼	½	¾	¿
Cx	À	Á	Â	Ã	[	Å	Æ	Ç	È	É	Ê	Ë	Ì	Í	Î	Ï
Dx	Ð	Ñ	Ò	Ó	Ô	Õ	\	×	Ø	Ù	Ú	Û	]	Ý	Þ	~
Ex	à	á	â	ã	{	å	æ	ç	è	é	ê	ë	ì	í	î	ï
Fx	ð	ñ	ò	ó	ô	õ	|	÷	ø	ù	ú	û	}	ý	þ	ÿ

Differences from ISO-8859-1

=== DIN 66303:1986-11 – General Reference Version of the 8-Bit-Code (ARV8) ===
ARV8
- Standard: DIN 66303:1986-11
- Classification: Extended ASCII
- Extends: US-ASCII
- Extensions: DEC MCS; BraSCII; All "Latin" parts of ISO/IEC 8859 (1, 2, 3, 4, 9, 10, 13, 14, 15, 16)
- Transforms / Encodes: DIN 66003
- Succeeded by: DIN 66303:2000-06 (ISO-8859-1)

The name "ARV8" is associated with ISO-8859-1 without rearrangement. Shown below is the common subset of the Latin parts of ISO 8859, which corresponds to the definition of ARV8 in the 1986 edition of DIN 66303.

General Reference Version of the 8-Bit-Code (ARV8)
	0	1	2	3	4	5	6	7	8	9	A	B	C	D	E	F
0x																
1x																
2x	SP	!	"	#	$	%	&	'	(	)	*	+	,	-	.	/
3x	0	1	2	3	4	5	6	7	8	9	:	;	<	=	>	?
4x	@	A	B	C	D	E	F	G	H	I	J	K	L	M	N	O
5x	P	Q	R	S	T	U	V	W	X	Y	Z	[	\	]		_
6x	`	a	b	c	d	e	f	g	h	i	j	k	l	m	n	o
7x	p	q	r	s	t	u	v	w	x	y	z	{	|	}	~	
8x																
9x																
Ax																
Bx																
Cx					Ä											
Dx							Ö						Ü			ß
Ex					ä											
Fx							ö						ü			
