= DIN 66003 =

German standard 7-bit character encoding

- DIN: 66003
- Area: Character encoding
- Title: Information processing; 7-Bit-Code
- Summary: Character set standard for character encoding in computer systems
- Last output: 1999-02

DIN 66003
- MIME / IANA: DIN_66003
- Alias(es): IBM-1011, MS-10206, ISO646-DE, ISO-IR-21, csISO21German, GERMAN, DE, D7DEC
- Standard: DIN 66003
- Classification: ISO/IEC 646, DEC NRCS
- Based on: US-ASCII
- Extensions: DRV8
- Succeeded by: DIN 66303 (DRV8, ARV8 and ISO-8859-1)
- Other related encoding: NATS-SEFI

The German standard DIN 66003, also known as Code page 1011 (CCSID 1011; abbreviated CP1011) by IBM, Code page 20106 (abbreviated CP20106) by Microsoft and D7DEC by Oracle, is a modification of 7-bit ASCII with adaptations for the German language, replacing certain symbol characters with umlauts and the eszett. It is the German national version of ISO/IEC 646 (ISO 646-DE), and also a localised option in DEC's National Replacement Character Set (NRCS) for their VT220 terminals.

It is registered with the ISO-IR registry for use with ISO/IEC 2022 as ISO-IR-21. Kermit calls it GERMAN, but also accepts the IANA-registered name ISO646-DE. Other IANA-registered names include DIN_66003, csISO21German and simply de.

== Code page layout ==
DIN 66003
	0	1	2	3	4	5	6	7	8	9	A	B	C	D	E	F
0x	NUL	SOH	STX	ETX	EOT	ENQ	ACK	BEL	BS	HT	LF	VT	FF	CR	SO	SI
1x	DLE	DC1	DC2	DC3	DC4	NAK	SYN	ETB	CAN	EM	SUB	ESC	FS	GS	RS	US
2x	SP	!	"	#	$	%	&	'	(	)	*	+	,	-	.	/
3x	0	1	2	3	4	5	6	7	8	9	:	;	<	=	>	?
4x	§ 00A7	A	B	C	D	E	F	G	H	I	J	K	L	M	N	O
5x	P	Q	R	S	T	U	V	W	X	Y	Z	Ä 00C4	Ö 00D6	Ü 00DC		_
6x	`	a	b	c	d	e	f	g	h	i	j	k	l	m	n	o
7x	p	q	r	s	t	u	v	w	x	y	z	ä 00E4	ö 00F6	ü 00FC	ß 00DF	DEL

Differences from ASCII

== See also ==
- National Replacement Character Set (NRCS)
