= ISO 7736 =

Standard size for dashed mounted head units for car audio

ISO 7736 is a standard size for dashboard mounted head units, for car audio. It was originally established by the German national organization for standardization, the Deutsches Institut für Normung, as DIN 75490, and is therefore commonly referred to as the DIN size. It was adopted by the International Organization for Standardization in 1984.

It does not define connectors for car audio, which are defined in ISO 10487.

Head units are generally designed around the single (180 x 50 mm panel) or double DIN (180 x 100.3 mm panel) sizes, with a recent trend towards the latter with the increasing popularity of large, touch-screen displays and interfaces like Apple CarPlay and Android Auto.

== Gallery ==
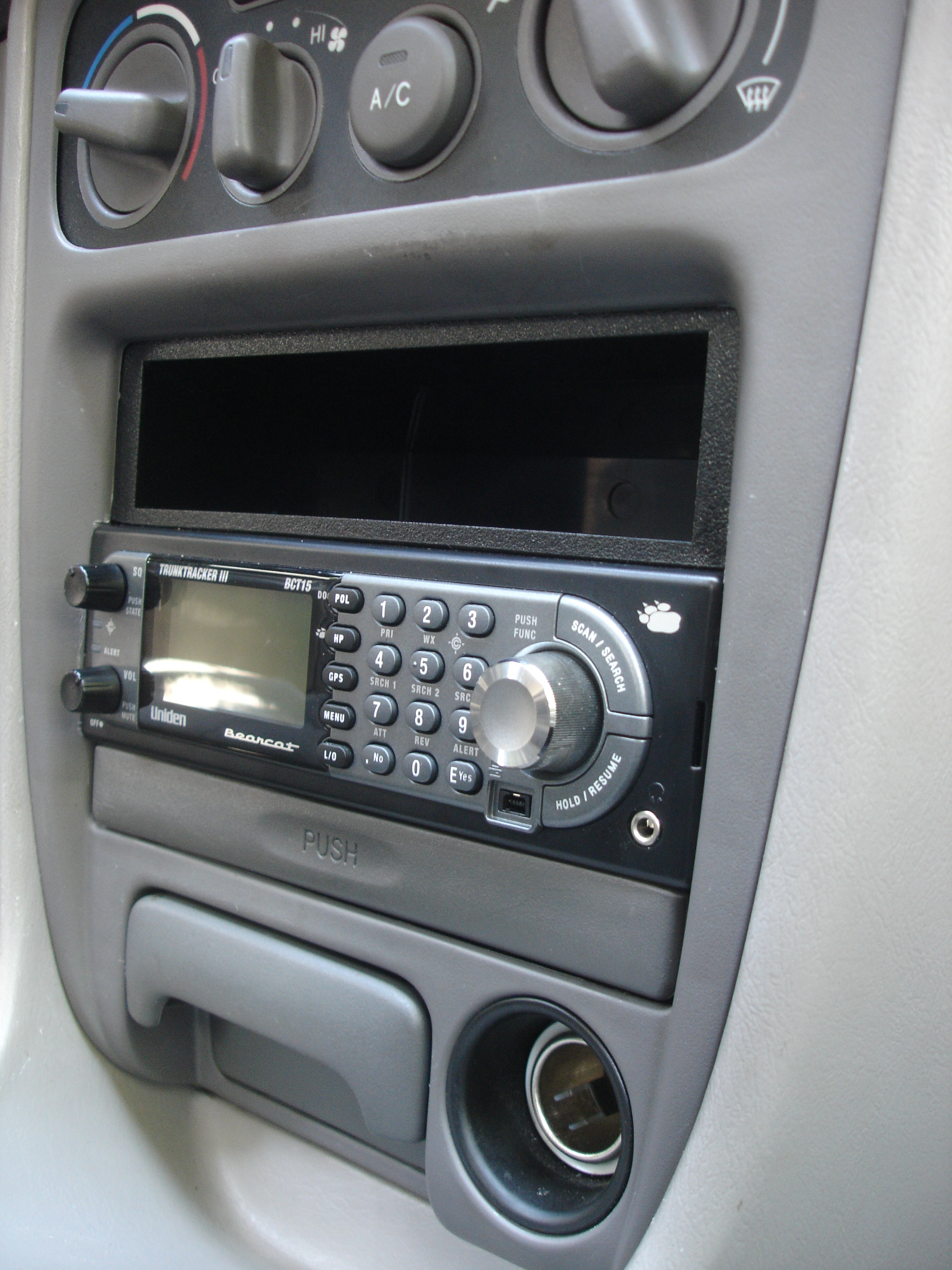
Uniden BCT-15 installed into double DIN using a spacer pocket

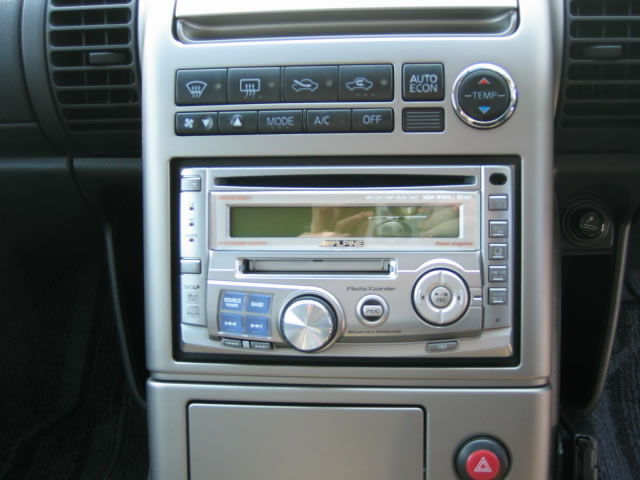
Alpine double DIN head unit
