= BraSCII =

Brazilian character encoding

- Alias(es): ABNT
- Languages: Portuguese, English, various others
- Standard: ABNT NBR 9611:1991
- Classification: Extended ASCII
- Extends: ECMA-94:1985
- Based on: DEC MCS
- Other related encoding: ISO-8859-1 (ECMA-94:1986 or later)

BraSCII is an encoded repertoire of characters that was used in Brazil. It was used in the 1980s on several printers, in applications like Carta Certa, in video boards and it was the standard character set in the Brazilian line of MSX computers. This code page is known by Star printers as Code page 3847.

== History ==
This character set was devised in 1986 by the Brazilian National Standards Organization (Associação Brasileira de Normas Técnicas (ABNT)) through the standard NBR-9614:1986 and later revised in 1991 in the standard NBR-9611:1991.

The code is based on the ISO/IEC 4873 standards, and it was nicknamed "BraSCII" (Brazilian Standard Code for Information Interchange) in analogy to "American Standard Code for Information Interchange" (ASCII). While ASCII is a 7-bit code, BraSCII is an 8-bit code, where the characters from 160 to 255 were configured to support extended characters. It is nearly identical to ECMA-94 (1985) and ISO 8859-1 (1987) except that the characters × and ÷ are replaced by Œ and œ, as they still were in the Multinational Character Set (MCS, 1983) and Lotus International Character Set (LICS, 1985), whereas these code points were empty in the earliest versions of ECMA-94 (1985) and ISO 8859-1. However, it is completely identical for the first draft of ECMA-94 and ISO 8859-1. In some other devices, this character set is simply referred as "ABNT".

This character set was different from the other Brazilian character set, ABICOMP.

The goal of this character set was to eliminate the "Babel's Tower" of the existing coding systems for the Portuguese language (ISO IR-16, ISO IR-84, IBM 256, IBM 275, IBM 850, DEC Multinational, HP Roman-8, Mac OS Roman, etc.). In spite of that, this code set had troubles in imposing itself, mainly due to the pressure of big multinational corporations and finished by being less and less used because of the ubiquity of other character sets (ISO 8859-1 and later Unicode).

== Coverage ==
Each character is encoded as a single eight-bit code value. These code values can be used in almost any data interchange system to communicate in the following languages (with a few exceptions due to missing characters, as noted):

- Afrikaans
- Albanian
- Basque
- Breton
- Corsican
- Danish (Note: Complete support except for Ǿ/ǿ which are missing. Ǿ/ǿ can be replaced with Ø/ø or øe at the cost of increased ambiguity.)
- English (Note: US and modern British.)
- Faroese
- Galician
- German
- Icelandic
- Irish
- Indonesian
- Italian
- Leonese
- Luxembourgish (Note: Basic classical orthography.)
- Malay (Note: Rumi script.)
- Manx
- Norwegian (Note: Bokmål and Nynorsk.)
- Occitan
- Portuguese (Note: European and Brazilian.)
- Rhaeto-Romanic
- Scottish Gaelic
- Scots
- Spanish
- Swahili
- Swedish
- Tagalog
- Walloon

Notes

The letter ÿ, which appears in French only very rarely, and never at the beginning of words, is included only in lowercase form. The slot corresponding to its uppercase form is occupied by the lowercase letter ß from the German language, which itself is rarely used in its uppercase form.

== Character set ==
BraSCII
	0	1	2	3	4	5	6	7	8	9	A	B	C	D	E	F
0x																
1x																
2x	SP	!	"	#	$	%	&	'	(	)	*	+	,	-	.	/
3x	0	1	2	3	4	5	6	7	8	9	:	;	<	=	>	?
4x	@	A	B	C	D	E	F	G	H	I	J	K	L	M	N	O
5x	P	Q	R	S	T	U	V	W	X	Y	Z	[	\	]		_
6x	'	a	b	c	d	e	f	g	h	i	j	k	l	m	n	o
7x	p	q	r	s	t	u	v	w	x	y	z	{	|	}	~	
8x																
9x																
Ax	NBSP	¡	¢	£	¤	¥	¦	§	¨	©	ª	«	¬	SHY	®	¯
Bx	°	±	²	³	'	μ	¶	·	¸	¹	º	»	¼	½	¾	¿
Cx	À	Á	Â	Ã	Ä	Å	Æ	Ç	È	É	Ê	Ë	Ì	Í	Î	Ï
Dx	Ð	Ñ	Ò	Ó	Ô	Õ	Ö	Œ 0152	Ø	Ù	Ú	Û	Ü	Ý	Þ	ß
Ex	à	á	â	ã	ä	å	æ	ç	è	é	ê	ë	ì	í	î	ï
Fx	ð	ñ	ò	ó	ô	õ	ö	œ 0153	ø	ù	ú	û	ü	ý	þ	ÿ

Differences from ISO 8859-1
