= VT100 encoding =

Character encoding on Macintosh computers

VT100
- Languages: English, various others
- Classification: Extended ASCII, Mac OS script
- Extends: ASCII

The VT100 code page is a character encoding used to represent text on the Classic Mac OS for compatibility with the VT100 terminal. It encodes 256 characters, the first 128 of which are identical to ASCII, with the remaining characters including mathematical symbols, diacritics, and additional punctuation marks. It is suitable for English and several other Western languages. It is similar to Mac OS Roman but includes all characters in ISO 8859-1 except for the currency sign (which was superseded by the euro sign), the no-break space, and the soft hyphen. It also includes all characters in DEC Special Graphics (code page 1090), except for the new line and no-break space controls. The VT100 encoding is only used on the VT100 font on the Classic Mac OS and is not an official Mac OS character encoding.

== Code page layout ==
The following table shows how characters are encoded in the VT100 character set. Each character is shown with its Unicode equivalent.

VT100
	0	1	2	3	4	5	6	7	8	9	A	B	C	D	E	F
0x	NUL	SOH	STX	ETX	EOT	ENQ	ACK	BEL	BS	HT	LF	VT	FF	CR	SO	SI
1x	DLE	DC1	DC2	DC3	DC4	NAK	SYN	ETB	CAN	EM	SUB	ESC	FS	GS	RS	US
2x	SP	!	"	#	$	%	&	'	(	)	*	+	,	-	.	/
3x	0	1	2	3	4	5	6	7	8	9	:	;	<	=	>	?
4x	@	A	B	C	D	E	F	G	H	I	J	K	L	M	N	O
5x	P	Q	R	S	T	U	V	W	X	Y	Z	[	\	]		_
6x	`	a	b	c	d	e	f	g	h	i	j	k	l	m	n	o
7x	p	q	r	s	t	u	v	w	x	y	z	{	|	}	~	DEL
8x	Ä	Å	Ç	É	Ñ	Ö	Ü	á	à	â	ä	ã	å	ç	é	è
9x	ê	ë	í	ì	î	ï	ñ	ó	ò	ô	ö	õ	ú	ù	û	ü
Ax	Ý	°	¢	£	§	¸	¶	ß	®	©	™	´	¨	≠	Æ	Ø
Bx	×	±	≤	≥	¥	µ	¹	²	³	π	¦	ª	º	▒	æ	ø
Cx	¿	¡	¬	½	ƒ	¼	¾	«	»	…	� (Note: The character 0xCA is the replacement character, which is displayed as a reversed question mark in this encoding.)	À	Ã	Õ	Œ	œ
Dx	–	—	┘	┐	┌	└	÷	◆	ÿ	Ÿ	┼	€ (Note: Before Mac OS 8.5, the character 0xDB mapped to currency sign (¤), Unicode character U+00A4.)	Ð	ð	Þ	þ
Ex	ý	·	⎺	⎻	─ (Note: The character 0xE4 is the horizontal scan line-5, which is unified with U+2500 in Unicode.)	Â	Ê	Á	Ë	È	Í	Î	Ï	Ì	Ó	Ô
Fx		Ò	Ú	Û	Ù	⎼	⎽	├	┤	┴	┬	│				
