= Windows-1254 =

Windows character set for Turkish

- MIME / IANA: windows-1254
- Alias(es): cp1254 (Code page 1254)
- Language: Turkish
- Created by: Microsoft
- Standard: WHATWG Encoding Standard
- Classification: extended ASCII, Windows-125x
- Extends: ISO 8859-9 (without single-byte C1 controls)

Windows-1254 is a code page used under Microsoft Windows (and for the web), to write Turkish that it was designed for (and the vast majority of users use it for that language, even though it can also be used for some other languages). Characters with codepoints A0 through FF are compatible with ISO 8859-9, but the CR range, which is reserved for C1 control codes in ISO 8859, is instead used for additional characters (analogous to the relationship between ISO-8859-1 and Windows-1252). It matches Windows-1252 except for the replacement of six Icelandic characters (Ðð, Ýý, Þþ) with characters unique to the Turkish alphabet (Ğğ, İ, ı, Şş).

The WHATWG Encoding Standard, which specifies the character encodings which are permitted in HTML5 and which compliant browsers must support, includes Windows-1254, which is used for both the Windows-1254 and ISO-8859-9 labels. Unicode is preferred for modern applications; authors of new pages and the designers of new protocols are instructed to use UTF-8 instead. As of 2023, less than 0.05% of all web pages use Windows-1254, and less than 0.05% use ISO-8859-9, which the WHATWG also requires web browsers to handle as Windows-1254. Since 2.2% of all websites located in Turkey use ISO-8859-9, plus the 1.3% that actually declare Windows-1254 used, in effect, 3.5% of websites there use Windows-1254.

IBM uses code page 1254 (CCSID 1254 and euro sign extended CCSID 5350) for Windows-1254.

== Character set ==
The following table shows Windows-1254. Each character is shown with its Unicode equivalent.

Windows-1254
	0	1	2	3	4	5	6	7	8	9	A	B	C	D	E	F
0x	NUL	SOH	STX	ETX	EOT	ENQ	ACK	BEL	BS	HT	LF	VT	FF	CR	SO	SI
1x	DLE	DC1	DC2	DC3	DC4	NAK	SYN	ETB	CAN	EM	SUB	ESC	FS	GS	RS	US
2x	SP	!	"	#	$	%	&	'	(	)	*	+	,	-	.	/
3x	0	1	2	3	4	5	6	7	8	9	:	;	<	=	>	?
4x	@	A	B	C	D	E	F	G	H	I	J	K	L	M	N	O
5x	P	Q	R	S	T	U	V	W	X	Y	Z	[	\	]		_
6x	`	a	b	c	d	e	f	g	h	i	j	k	l	m	n	o
7x	p	q	r	s	t	u	v	w	x	y	z	{	|	}	~	DEL
8x	€		‚	ƒ	„	…	†	‡	ˆ	‰	Š	‹	Œ			
9x		‘	’	“	”	•	–	—	˜	™	š	›	œ			Ÿ
Ax	NBSP	¡	¢	£	¤	¥	¦	§	¨	©	ª	«	¬	SHY	®	¯
Bx	°	±	²	³	´	µ	¶	·	¸	¹	º	»	¼	½	¾	¿
Cx	À	Á	Â	Ã	Ä	Å	Æ	Ç	È	É	Ê	Ë	Ì	Í	Î	Ï
Dx	Ğ	Ñ	Ò	Ó	Ô	Õ	Ö	×	Ø	Ù	Ú	Û	Ü	İ	Ş	ß
Ex	à	á	â	ã	ä	å	æ	ç	è	é	ê	ë	ì	í	î	ï
Fx	ğ	ñ	ò	ó	ô	õ	ö	÷	ø	ù	ú	û	ü	ı	ş	ÿ

Differences from Windows-1252

== See also ==
- Latin script in Unicode
- LMBCS-8
- Unicode
- Universal Character Set
  - European Unicode subset (DIN 91379)
- UTF-8
- Western Latin character sets (computing)
- Windows-1250
- Windows code pages
- ISO/IEC JTC 1/SC 2
