= Multinational Character Set =

DEC character encoding used on VT220 terminals

Multinational Character Set (MCS)
- MIME / IANA: DEC-MCS
- Alias(es): IBM1100, CP1100, WE8DEC, csDECMCS, dec
- Languages: English, various others
- Extends: US-ASCII
- Succeeded by: ISO 8859-1, LICS, BraSCII, Cork encoding

The Multinational Character Set (DMCS or MCS) is a character encoding created in 1983 by Digital Equipment Corporation (DEC) for use in the popular VT220 terminal. It was an 8-bit extension of ASCII that added accented characters, currency symbols, and other character glyphs missing from 7-bit ASCII. It is only one of the code pages implemented for the VT220 National Replacement Character Set (NRCS). MCS is registered as IBM code page/CCSID 1100 (Multinational Emulation) since 1992. Depending on associated sorting Oracle calls it WE8DEC, N8DEC, DK8DEC, S8DEC, or SF8DEC.

Such "extended ASCII" sets were common (the National Replacement Character Set provided sets for more than a dozen European languages), but MCS has the distinction of being the ancestor of ECMA-94 in 1985 and ISO 8859-1 in 1987.

The code chart of MCS with ECMA-94, ISO 8859-1 and the first 256 code points of Unicode have many more similarities than differences. In addition to unused code points, differences from ISO 8859-1 are:

MCS code point	Unicode mapping	Character
0xA8	U+00A4	¤
0xD7	U+0152	Œ
0xDD	U+0178	Ÿ
0xF7	U+0153	œ
0xFD	U+00FF	ÿ

== Character set ==
DEC Multinational Character Set
	0	1	2	3	4	5	6	7	8	9	A	B	C	D	E	F
0_	NUL	SOH	STX	ETX	EOT	ENQ	ACK	BEL	BS	HT	LF	VT	FF	CR	SO	SI
1_	DLE	DC1	DC2	DC3	DC4	NAK	SYN	ETB	CAN	EM	SUB	ESC	FS	GS	RS	US
2_	SP	!	"	#	$	%	&	'	(	)	*	+	,	-	.	/
3_	0	1	2	3	4	5	6	7	8	9	:	;	<	=	>	?
4_	@	A	B	C	D	E	F	G	H	I	J	K	L	M	N	O
5_	P	Q	R	S	T	U	V	W	X	Y	Z	[	\	]		_
6_	`	a	b	c	d	e	f	g	h	i	j	k	l	m	n	o
7_	p	q	r	s	t	u	v	w	x	y	z	{	|	}	~	DEL
8_					IND	NEL	SSA	ESA	HTS	HTJ	VTS	PLD	PLU	RI	SS2	SS3
9_	DCS	PU1	PU2	STS	CCH	MW	SPA	EPA				CSI	ST	OSC	PM	APC
A_		¡	¢	£		¥		§	¤ 00A4	©	ª	«				
B_	°	±	²	³		µ	¶	·		¹	º	»	¼	½		¿
C_	À	Á	Â	Ã	Ä	Å	Æ	Ç	È	É	Ê	Ë	Ì	Í	Î	Ï
D_		Ñ	Ò	Ó	Ô	Õ	Ö	Œ 0152	Ø	Ù	Ú	Û	Ü	Ÿ 0178		ß
E_	à	á	â	ã	ä	å	æ	ç	è	é	ê	ë	ì	í	î	ï
F_		ñ	ò	ó	ô	õ	ö	œ 0153	ø	ù	ú	û	ü	ÿ 00FF		

Differences from ISO-8859-1

== See also ==
- Lotus International Character Set (LICS), a very similar character set
- BraSCII, a very similar character set
- 8-bit DEC Greek (Code page 1287)
- 8-bit DEC Turkish (Code page 1288)
- 8-bit DEC Hebrew
- 8-bit DEC Cyrillic (KOI-8 Cyrillic)
- 8-bit DEC Special Graphics (VT100 Line Drawing) (DEC-SPECIAL)
- 8-bit DEC Technical Character Set (DEC-TECHNICAL)
- DEC Kanji (JIS X 0208)
