= Lotus International Character Set =

Single-byte character encoding

The Lotus International Character Set (LICS) is a proprietary single-byte character encoding introduced in 1985 by Lotus Development Corporation. It is based on the 1983 DEC Multinational Character Set (MCS) for VT220 terminals. As such, LICS is also similar to two other descendants of MCS, the ECMA-94 character set of 1985 and the ISO 8859-1 (Latin-1) character set of 1987.

LICS was first introduced as the character set of Lotus 1-2-3 Release 2 for DOS in 1985. It is also utilized by 2.01, 2.2, 2.3 and 2.4 as well as by Symphony. It was also utilized in a number of third-party spreadsheet products emulating the file format. LICS was superseded by the Lotus Multi-Byte Character Set (LMBCS) introduced by Lotus 1-2-3 Release 3 in 1989.

== Character set ==
Codepoints 20_{hex} (32) to 7F_{hex} (127) are identical to ASCII (as well as to LMBCS). For some characters the table also lists dedicated Lotus 1-2-3 compose key sequences to ease character input beyond the Alt Numpad input method.

Lotus International Character Set
	0	1	2	3	4	5	6	7	8	9	A	B	C	D	E	F
0x	NUL	SOH	STX	ETX	EOT	ENQ	ACK	BEL	BS	HT	LF	VT	FF	CR	SO	SI
1x	DLE	DC1	DC2	DC3	DC4	NAK	SYN	ETB	CAN	EM	SUB	ESC	FS	GS	RS	US
2x	SP	!	"	#	$	%	&	'	(	)	*	+	,	-	.	/
3x	0	1	2	3	4	5	6	7	8	9	:	;	<	=	>	?
4x	@	A	B	C	D	E	F	G	H	I	J	K	L	M	N	O
5x	P	Q	R	S	T	U	V	W	X	Y	Z	[	\	]		_
6x	`	a	b	c	d	e	f	g	h	i	j	k	l	m	n	o
7x	p	q	r	s	t	u	v	w	x	y	z	{	|	}	~	▒
8x	◌̀	◌́	◌̂	◌̈	◌̃											
9x	◌̀	◌́	◌̂	◌̈	◌̃	ı	◌̱	▲	▼		NBSP	←				
Ax	ƒ	¡	¢	£	“	¥	₧	§	¤	©	ª	«	Δ	π	≥	÷
Bx	°	±	²	³	„	µ/μ	¶	·	™	¹	º	»	¼	½	≤	¿
Cx	À	Á	Â	Ã	Ä	Å	Æ	Ç	È	É	Ê	Ë	Ì	Í	Î	Ï
Dx	Ð	Ñ	Ò	Ó	Ô	Õ	Ö	Œ	Ø	Ù	Ú	Û	Ü	Ÿ	Þ	ß
Ex	à	á	â	ã	ä	å	æ	ç	è	é	ê	ë	ì	í	î	ï
Fx	ð	ñ	ò	ó	ô	õ	ö	œ	ø	ù	ú	û	ü	ÿ	þ	

Differences from ISO-8859-1

== See also ==
- Lotus Multi-Byte Character Set (LMBCS)
- DEC Multinational Character Set (MCS)
- BraSCII
