= ISO/IEC 8859-15 =

ASCII-based standard character encodings in the ISO/IEC 8859 series

ISO/IEC 8859-15:1999
- MIME / IANA: ISO-8859-15
- Alias(es): latin-9, latin-0, latin-6
- Standard: ISO/IEC 8859
- Based on: ISO-8859-1
- Preceded by: ISO-8859-1
- Succeeded by: UTF-8

ISO/IEC 8859-15:1999, Information technology — 8-bit single-byte coded graphic character sets — Part 15: Latin alphabet No. 9, is part of the ISO/IEC 8859 series of ASCII-based standard character encodings, first edition published in 1999. It is informally referred to as Latin-9 (and for a while Latin-0). It is similar to ISO 8859-1, and thus also intended for “Western European” languages, but replaces some less common symbols with the euro sign and some letters that were deemed necessary.

| | A4 | A6 | A8 | B4 | B8 | BC | BD | BE |
|---|---|---|---|---|---|---|---|---|
| 8859-1 | ¤ | ¦ | ¨ | ´ | ¸ | ¼ | ½ | ¾ |
| 8859-15 | € | Š | š | Ž | ž | Œ | œ | Ÿ |

ISO-8859-15 is the IANA preferred charset name for this standard when supplemented with the C0 and C1 control codes from ISO/IEC 6429.

Microsoft has assigned code page 28605 a.k.a. Windows-28605 to ISO-8859-15. IBM has assigned code page 923 (CCSID 923) to ISO 8859-15.

All the printable characters from both ISO/IEC 8859-1 and ISO/IEC 8859-15 are also found in Windows-1252. Since October 2016, less than 0.1% (actually currently less than 0.02%) of all web sites use ISO-8859-15.

== History ==
The identifier ISO 8859-15 was proposed for the Sami languages in 1996, which was eventually rejected, but was passed as ISO-IR 197.

ISO 8859-16 was proposed as a similar encoding to today's ISO 8859-15, to replace 11 unused or rarely used ISO 8859-1 characters with the missing French Œ œ (at the same spot as same place as DEC-MCS and Lotus International Character Set) and Ÿ (which was not at the same place as these sets, as Ý was in that spot for Icelandic), Dutch Ĳ ĳ, and Turkish Ğ ğ İ ı Ş ş. The euro sign did not exist at the time.

The draft was as follows:

Proposed (but not adopted) ISO/IEC 8859-15
| | 0 | 1 | 2 | 3 | 4 | 5 | 6 | 7 | 8 | 9 | A | B | C | D | E | F |
|---|---|---|---|---|---|---|---|---|---|---|---|---|---|---|---|---|
| Ax | NBSP | ¡ | ¢ | £ | ¤ | Ĳ 0132 | ¦ | § | ĳ 0133 | © | ª | « | ¬ | SHY | ® | ¯ |
| Bx | ° | ± | Ğ 011E | ğ 011F | İ 0130 | µ | ¶ | · | ı 0131 | Ş 015E | º | » | ş 015F | ½ | Ÿ 0178 | ¿ |
| Cx | À | Á | Â | Ã | Ä | Å | Æ | Ç | È | É | Ê | Ë | Ì | Í | Î | Ï |
| Dx | Ð | Ñ | Ò | Ó | Ô | Õ | Ö | Œ 0152 | Ø | Ù | Ú | Û | Ü | Ý | Þ | ß |
| Ex | à | á | â | ã | ä | å | æ | ç | è | é | ê | ë | ì | í | î | ï |
| Fx | ð | ñ | ò | ó | ô | õ | ö | œ 0153 | ø | ù | ú | û | ü | ý | þ | ÿ |

The name was later changed to ISO-8859-0 and was restructured by 1997. The Turkish characters were removed because it was considered that it would potentially do more harm to Turkish then-current practice while UCS (Unicode) implementation was not that far away, and the Dutch IJ ligature was removed as the existing digraph ij was found to be adequate. It was also considered to add the Welsh Ŵ ŵ and Ŷ ŷ, but that was postponed pending further investigation. 4 unused or rarely used ISO 8859-1 characters (¤, ¨, ´, and ¸) were replaced with €, Ÿ, Œ, and œ respectively. € became necessary when the euro was introduced. Ÿ is needed so that French text can be converted from lower-case to all-caps and back again without loss, and Œ and œ are French ligatures. Ironically, the last three had already been present in DEC's Multinational Character Set (MCS) in 1983, a character set from which ECMA-94 (1985) and ISO-8859-1 (1987) were derived. Since their original codepoints were now occupied by other characters, less logical codepoints had to be chosen for their reintroduction.

The same proposal also recommended replacing 6 more characters (¢, ¦, ±, ¼, ½, ¾) with "some other characters to cover a maximum of languages". The reasons for choosing these characters was stated in the proposal. For the euro sign, some wanted to replace the plus–minus sign instead of the currency sign. The currency sign is used in some applications as a field separator and in some others to indicate subtotal. There was strong opposition to this. One person said "The proposed «+-» is not an adequate fall-back, as this sequence, though rarely used, has already a fixed mathematical meaning, quite different from «±»; and, even if a reader would deduce the intended meaning, «±», from the context, «+-» in lieu of «±» will hurt a physicist's æsthetic feelings at least as much as «oe» in lieu of an o-e ligature a Francophone's." In the end, ± was kept, and ¤ was removed (as originally planned).

Circa 1997/1998 (when Windows-1252 was updated) four characters were selected: Š, š, Ž, and ž, which are used in Finnish and Estonian for the transliteration of Russian loanwords and names. The proposal was renamed to ISO 8859-15 at the same time. In the end the characters ¦, ¼, ½, and ¾ were removed, while ¢ was kept because it was more common than the other four.

There were attempts to make ISO 8859-15 the default character set for 8-bit communication, but it was never able to supplant the popular ISO 8859-1. It did see some use as the default character set for the text console and terminal programs under Linux when the euro sign was needed, but the use of full Unicode was not practical, but this has since been replaced with UTF-8.

== Coverage ==
ISO 8859-15 encodes what it refers to as "Latin alphabet no. 9". This character set is used throughout the Americas, Western Europe, Oceania, and much of Africa. It is also commonly used in most standard romanizations of East-Asian languages.

Each character is encoded as a single eight-bit code value. These code values can be used in almost any data interchange system to communicate in the following languages:

- Afrikaans
- Albanian
- Breton
- Catalan
- Danish (Note: Complete support except for Ǿ/ǿ which are missing. Ǿ/ǿ can be replaced with Ø/ø at the cost of increased ambiguity.)
- Dutch (Note: Commonly supported with nearly complete coverage of the Dutch alphabet, as the missing Ĳ, ĳ should always be represented as two-character IJ or ij in electronic form.)
- English (Note: US and modern British)
- Estonian
- Faroese
- Finnish
- French
- Galician
- German (Note: Complete support except for uppercase ẞ, which not officially adopted by the Council for German Orthography until 2017.)
- Icelandic
- Irish (Note: New orthography)
- Italian
- Latin (Note: Basic classical orthography)
- Luxembourgish
- Malay (Note: Rumi script)
- Norwegian (Note: Bokmål and Nynorsk)
- Occitan
- Portuguese (Note: European and Brazilian)
- Rhaeto-Romanic
- Rotokas
- Scots
- Scottish Gaelic
- Spanish
- Swahili
- Swedish
- Tagalog
- Walloon

=== Coverage of punctuation signs and apostrophes ===
Like all the ISO-8859 encodings and ASCII it lacks symbols which are needed for attractive and correct typography:

- Only « », " ", and ' ' quotation marks are included. "Curly" quotation marks are missing, as are baseline quotation marks and single guillemets used by some of the supported languages. "Curly" apostrophe is also missing.
- The en dash and em dash are missing.

Windows-1252 added all of these characters.

== Code page layout ==
Differences from ISO-8859-1 have the Unicode code point shown underneath the character.

ISO/IEC 8859-15
| | 0 | 1 | 2 | 3 | 4 | 5 | 6 | 7 | 8 | 9 | A | B | C | D | E | F |
|---|---|---|---|---|---|---|---|---|---|---|---|---|---|---|---|---|
| 0x | | | | | | | | | | | | | | | | |
| 1x | | | | | | | | | | | | | | | | |
| 2x | SP | ! | " | # | $ | % | & | ' | ( | ) | * | + | , | - | . | / |
| 3x | 0 | 1 | 2 | 3 | 4 | 5 | 6 | 7 | 8 | 9 | : | ; | < | = | > | ? |
| 4x | @ | A | B | C | D | E | F | G | H | I | J | K | L | M | N | O |
| 5x | P | Q | R | S | T | U | V | W | X | Y | Z | [ | \ | ] | | _ |
| 6x | ` | a | b | c | d | e | f | g | h | i | j | k | l | m | n | o |
| 7x | p | q | r | s | t | u | v | w | x | y | z | { | | | } | ~ | |
| 8x | | | | | | | | | | | | | | | | |
| 9x | | | | | | | | | | | | | | | | |
| Ax | NBSP | ¡ | ¢ | £ | € 20AC | ¥ | Š 0160 | § | š 0161 | © | ª | « | ¬ | SHY | ® | ¯ |
| Bx | ° | ± | ² | ³ | Ž 017D | µ | ¶ | · | ž 017E | ¹ | º | » | Œ 0152 | œ 0153 | Ÿ 0178 | ¿ |
| Cx | À | Á | Â | Ã | Ä | Å | Æ | Ç | È | É | Ê | Ë | Ì | Í | Î | Ï |
| Dx | Ð | Ñ | Ò | Ó | Ô | Õ | Ö | × | Ø | Ù | Ú | Û | Ü | Ý | Þ | ß |
| Ex | à | á | â | ã | ä | å | æ | ç | è | é | ê | ë | ì | í | î | ï |
| Fx | ð | ñ | ò | ó | ô | õ | ö | ÷ | ø | ù | ú | û | ü | ý | þ | ÿ |

== Aliases ==
ISO 8859-15 also has the following, vendor-specific aliases:

- WE8ISO8859P15 (Oracle database)

== See also ==
- Western Latin character sets (computing)
- DIN 91379 Unicode subset for Europe
