= Code page 850 =

Computer character set for Latin scripts

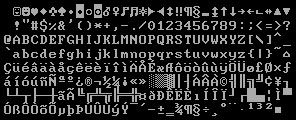
- Code page 850 character set with 9×14 glyphs, as usually rendered by Enhanced Graphics Array (EGA)
- MIME / IANA: IBM850
- Alias(es): cp850, 850, csPC850Multilingual, DOS Latin 1, OEM 850
- Languages: English, various others
- Classification: Extended ASCII, OEM code page
- Extends: US-ASCII
- Based on: OEM-US
- Transforms / Encodes: ISO/IEC 8859-1 (reordered)
- Other related encodings: Code page 858 (PC DOS 2000's "modified code page 850"), code page 437

Code page 850 (CCSID 850) (also known as CP 850, IBM 00850, OEM 850, DOS Latin 1) is a code page used under DOS operating systems (Note: as well as Psion's EPOC16 operating system) in Western Europe. Depending on the country setting and system configuration, code page 850 is the primary code page and default OEM code page in many countries, including various English-speaking locales (e.g. in the United Kingdom, Ireland, and Canada), whilst other English-speaking locales (like the United States) default to the hardware code page 437.

Code page 850 differs from code page 437 in that many of the box-drawing characters, Greek letters, and various symbols were replaced with additional Latin letters with diacritics, thus greatly improving support for Western European languages (all characters from ISO 8859-1 are included). At the same time, the changes frequently caused display glitches with programs that made use of the box-drawing characters to display a GUI-like surface in text mode.

After the DOS era, successor operating systems largely replaced code page 850 with Windows-1252, (Note: akin to and not always well-distinguished from ISO-8859-1) later UCS-2 and UTF-16, (Note: The Windows NT line was natively Unicode from the start, but issues of development tool support and compatibility with Windows 9x kept most applications on the 8-bit code pages.) and finally UTF-8. However, legacy applications, especially command-line programs, may still depend on support for older code pages.

== Character set ==
Each non-ASCII character appears with its equivalent Unicode code-point. Differences from code page 437 are limited to the second half of the table, the first half being the same.

Code page 850
	0	1	2	3	4	5	6	7	8	9	A	B	C	D	E	F
0x 0	NUL	☺︎ 263A	☻ 263B	♥︎ 2665	♦︎ 2666	♣︎ 2663	♠︎ 2660	• 2022	◘ 25D8	○ 25CB	◙ 25D9	♂︎ 2642	♀︎ 2640	♪ 266A	♫ 266B	☼ 263C
1x 16	► 25BA	◄ 25C4	↕︎ 2195	‼︎ 203C	¶ 00B6	§ 00A7	▬ 25AC	↨ 21A8	↑ 2191	↓ 2193	→ 2192	← 2190	∟ 221F	↔︎ 2194	▲25B2	▼25BC
2x 32	SP	!	"	#	$	%	&	'	(	)	*	+	,	-	.	/
3x 48	0	1	2	3	4	5	6	7	8	9	:	;	<	=	>	?
4x 64	@	A	B	C	D	E	F	G	H	I	J	K	L	M	N	O
5x 80	P	Q	R	S	T	U	V	W	X	Y	Z	[	\	]		_
6x 96	`	a	b	c	d	e	f	g	h	i	j	k	l	m	n	o
7x 112	p	q	r	s	t	u	v	w	x	y	z	{	|	}	~	⌂ 2302
8x 128	Ç 00C7	ü 00FC	é 00E9	â 00E2	ä 00E4	à 00E0	å 00E5	ç 00E7	ê 00EA	ë 00EB	è 00E8	ï 00EF	î 00EE	ì 00EC	Ä 00C4	Å 00C5
9x 144	É 00C9	æ 00E6	Æ 00C6	ô 00F4	ö 00F6	ò 00F2	û 00FB	ù 00F9	ÿ 00FF	Ö 00D6	Ü 00DC	ø 00F8	£ 00A3	Ø 00D8	× 00D7	ƒ 0192
Ax 160	á 00E1	í 00ED	ó 00F3	ú 00FA	ñ 00F1	Ñ 00D1	ª 00AA	º 00BA	¿ 00BF	® 00AE	¬ 00AC	½ 00BD	¼ 00BC	¡ 00A1	« 00AB	» 00BB
Bx 176	░ 2591	▒ 2592	▓ 2593	│ 2502	┤ 2524	Á 00C1	Â 00C2	À 00C0	© 00A9	╣ 2563	║ 2551	╗ 2557	╝ 255D	¢ 00A2	¥ 00A5	┐ 2510
Cx 192	└ 2514	┴ 2534	┬ 252C	├ 251C	─ 2500	┼ 253C	ã 00E3	Ã 00C3	╚ 255A	╔ 2554	╩ 2569	╦ 2566	╠ 2560	═ 2550	╬ 256C	¤ 00A4
Dx 208	ð 00F0	Ð 00D0	Ê 00CA	Ë 00CB	È 00C8	ı 0131	Í 00CD	Î 00CE	Ï 00CF	┘ 2518	┌ 250C	█ 2588	▄ 2584	¦ 00A6	Ì 00CC	▀ 2580
Ex 224	Ó 00D3	ß 00DF	Ô 00D4	Ò 00D2	õ 00F5	Õ 00D5	µ 00B5	þ 00FE	Þ 00DE	Ú 00DA	Û 00DB	Ù 00D9	ý 00FD	Ý 00DD	¯ 00AF	´ 00B4
Fx 240	SHY; 00AD	± 00B1	‗ 2017	¾ 00BE	¶ 00B6	§ 00A7	÷ 00F7	¸ 00B8	° 00B0	¨ 00A8	· 00B7	¹ 00B9	³ 00B3	² 00B2	■ 25A0	NBSP; 00A0

Differences from code page 437

== Code page 858 ==
Code page 858
- MIME / IANA: IBM00858
- Alias(es): CCSID00858, CP00858, PC-Multilingual-850+euro
- Transforms / Encodes: ISO 8859-1
- Preceded by: Code page 850

In 1998, code page 858 (CCSID 858) (also known as CP 858, IBM 00858, OEM 858) was derived from this code page by changing code point 213 (D5_{hex}) from a dotless i ⟨ı⟩ to the euro sign ⟨€⟩ U+20AC. Unlike most code pages modified to support the euro sign, the generic currency sign at CF_{hex} was not chosen as the character to replace (compare ISO-8859-15 (from ISO-8859-1), code pages 808 (from 866), 848 (from 1125), 849 (from 1131) and 872 (from 855), ISO-IR-205 (from ISO-8859-4), ISO-IR-206 (from ISO-8859-13), and the changes to MacRoman and MacCyrillic).

IBM's PC DOS 2000, also released in 1998, just changed the definition of 850 to match 858 and called it modified code page 850. This was done so programs that hard-coded 850 would be able to use the Euro sign. There may also have been a problem with Code Page Information (.CPI) files being limited to about six codepages maximum. More recent IBM/MS products implement codepage 858 under its own ID and have restored 850 to the original.

== See also ==
- Western Latin character sets (computing)
- Hardware code page
- LMBCS-1
