= Mac OS Roman =

Character encoding created by Apple

- MIME / IANA: macintosh
- Languages: English, various others
- Created by: Apple Computer, Inc.
- Classification: Extended ASCII, Mac OS script
- Extends: ASCII, Macintosh character set

Mac OS Roman is a character encoding created by Apple Computer, Inc. for use by Macintosh computers. It is suitable for representing text in English and several other languages that use the Latin script. Mac OS Roman encodes 256 characters, the first 128 of which are identical to ASCII, with the remaining characters including mathematical symbols, diacritics, and additional punctuation marks. Mac OS Roman is an extension of the original Macintosh character set, which encoded 217 characters. Full support for Mac OS Roman first appeared in System 6.0.4, released in 1989, and the encoding is still supported in current versions of macOS, though the standard character encoding is now UTF-8. Apple modified Mac OS Roman in 1998 with the release of Mac OS 8.5 by replacing the currency sign with the euro sign, but otherwise the encoding has been unchanged since its release.

== Character set ==
The following table shows how characters are encoded in Mac OS Roman. The row and column headings give the first and second digit of the hexadecimal code for each character in the table.

Mac OS Roman
	0	1	2	3	4	5	6	7	8	9	A	B	C	D	E	F
0x	NUL	SOH	STX	ETX	EOT	ENQ	ACK	BEL	BS	HT	LF	VT	FF	CR	SO	SI
1x	DLE	DC1	DC2	DC3	DC4	NAK	SYN	ETB	CAN	EM	SUB	ESC	FS	GS	RS	US
2x	SP	!	"	#	$	%	&	'	(	)	*	+	,	-	.	/
3x	0	1	2	3	4	5	6	7	8	9	:	;	<	=	>	?
4x	@	A	B	C	D	E	F	G	H	I	J	K	L	M	N	O
5x	P	Q	R	S	T	U	V	W	X	Y	Z	[	\	]		_
6x	`	a	b	c	d	e	f	g	h	i	j	k	l	m	n	o
7x	p	q	r	s	t	u	v	w	x	y	z	{	|	}	~	DEL
8x	Ä	Å	Ç	É	Ñ	Ö	Ü	á	à	â	ä	ã	å	ç	é	è
9x	ê	ë	í	ì	î	ï	ñ	ó	ò	ô	ö	õ	ú	ù	û	ü
Ax	†	°	¢	£	§	•	¶	ß	®	©	™	´	¨	≠	Æ	Ø
Bx	∞	±	≤	≥	¥	µ	∂	∑	∏	π	∫	ª	º	Ω (Note: Prior to December 1997, Apple's mapping published on Unicode.org mapped this character to U+2126 OHM SIGN.)	æ	ø
Cx	¿	¡	¬	√	ƒ	≈	∆	«	»	…	NBSP	À	Ã	Õ	Œ	œ
Dx	–	—	“	”	‘	’	÷	◊	ÿ	Ÿ	/	€ (Note: Before Mac OS 8.5, the character at position 0xDB was the generic currency sign (¤).)	‹	›	ﬁ	ﬂ
Ex	‡	·	‚	„	‰	Â	Ê	Á	Ë	È	Í	Î	Ï	Ì	Ó	Ô
Fx	(Note: The character at position 0xF0 is a solid Apple logo. Apple uses Unicode character U+F8FF in the Corporate Private Use Area for this character, but it may not be supported on non-Apple systems.)	Ò	Ú	Û	Ù	ı	ˆ	˜	¯	˘	˙	˚	¸	˝	˛	ˇ

== See also ==
- Western Latin character sets (computing)
