= Square sign =

Square sign may refer to:

- The number sign #
- The radical symbol $\sqrt{\,\,}$ or √ used for square root, or its precomposed form with a number, such as the Unicode characters for the cube root and the fourth root, ∛ and ∜
- Any square-shaped symbol, including many geometrically shaped Unicode characters
