= I with grave =

I with grave may refer to:

- I with grave (Cyrillic) (Ѝ, ѝ), a character representing a stressed variant of the regular letter ⟨И⟩ in some Cyrillic alphabets, including Bulgarian, Macedonian, Church Slavonic, Serbian, Russian and Ukrainian, not considered a separate letter
- Ì (Ì, ì), used in a variety of ways:
  - In the Romanization of Ukrainian, a representation of the Cyrillic letter І
  - In the Pinyin system of Chinese romanization, ì is an i with a falling tone
  - A variant of i used in Alcozauca Mixtec, Italian, Taos, Vietnamese, Welsh, Scottish Gaelic and also in the constructed language Na'vi
