= DEC Technical Character Set =

Character set supported by various DEC terminals

DEC Technical (TCS) is a 7-bit character set developed by Digital Equipment Corporation.

== Character set ==
DEC Technical
	0	1	2	3	4	5	6	7	8	9	A	B	C	D	E	F
0x	NUL	SOH	STX	ETX	EOT	ENQ	ACK	BEL	BS	HT	LF	VT	FF	CR	SO	SI
1x	DLE	DC1	DC2	DC3	DC4	NAK	SYN	ETB	CAN	EM	SUB	ESC	FS	GS	RS	US
2x	SP	⎷	┌	─	⌠	⌡	│	⎡	⎣	⎤	⎦	⎛	⎝	⎞	⎠	⎨
3x	⎬	⎲	⎳	╲	╱	⌝	⌟	⟩					≤	≠	≥	∫
4x	∴	∝	∞	÷	Δ	∇	Φ	Γ	∼	≃	Θ	×	Λ	⇔	⇒	≡
5x	Π	Ψ		Σ			√	Ω	Ξ	Υ	⊂	⊃	∩	∪	∧	∨
6x	¬	α	β	χ	δ	ε	φ	γ	η	ι	θ	κ	λ		ν	∂
7x	π	ψ	ρ	σ	τ		ƒ	ω	ξ	υ	ζ	←	↑	→	↓	DEL

Characters from 31 to 37 are intended to assemble a 3x5 uppercase sigma.

== See also ==
- DEC Multinational Character Set (MCS)
- DEC National Replacement Character Set (NRCS)
- DEC Special Graphics
- Symbol (typeface) § Encoding
