= Symbol (typeface) =

Typeface for mathematical typesetting

- Category: Serif
- Classification: Transitional

Symbol (which would appear as Σψμβολ if the name of the font is written in the font itself) is one of the four standard fonts available on all PostScript-based printers, starting with Apple's original LaserWriter (1985). It contains a complete unaccented Greek alphabet (upper and lower case) and a selection of commonly used mathematical symbols. Insofar as it fits into any standard classification, it is a serif font designed in the style of Times New Roman.

Due to its non-standard character set, lack of diacritical characters, and type design inappropriate for continuous text, Symbol cannot easily be used for setting Greek language text, though it has been used for that purpose in the absence of proper Greek fonts. Its primary purpose is to typeset mathematical expressions.

== Encoding ==
Symbol Encoding
- Code page layout (in DejaVu fonts). The vacant spot marked by the red Bowen knot (⌘) may be an Apple logo in some variants.
- Alias(es): x-mac-symbol, ibm-1038
- Languages: Mathematical notation, Greek (partial)
- Definitions: Adobe Symbol; Mac OS Symbol
- Classification: PostScript core pi font mapped over extended ASCII
- Other related encodings: ISO 646; Other PS pi fonts: Zapf Dingbats

The font was created by Adobe and has its own character encoding, with the Greek letters arranged according to similar Latin letters (Chi = C, etc.). The document describing the mapping to Unicode code points was created before several of the characters were added to Unicode, so the original mapping assigns several of the characters to the Private Use Area (PUA). A newer mapping table for Apple's version of the font uses more recently introduced Unicode code points instead. The table below mostly follows the Apple mapping.

IBM calls the encoding Code page 1038, although the code page definition predates the addition of the euro sign, and uses 0xA0 for a numeric space character.

Beyond the use of Private Use Area code points, Adobe and Apple have a few other minor differences in code point assignments. Character 0x27 (called "suchthat" in the Adobe document) is assigned by Adobe to U+220B (∋, CONTAINS AS MEMBER) but by Apple to U+220D (∍, SMALL CONTAINS AS MEMBER), which more closely resembles the symbol usually used for such that. Apple also introduces the Apple logo as PUA code point U+F8FF for character 0xF0, a position not used in the original Adobe font.

Lowercase Greek letters appear in italics in many older versions of Symbol. While both Adobe and Apple agree on assigning characters 0x66 and 0x6A respectively to Unicode code points U+03C6 φ GREEK SMALL LETTER PHI and U+03D5 ϕ GREEK PHI SYMBOL, some versions of the font interchange these two symbols.

Mapping of the angle bracket characters at 0xE1 and 0xF1 can vary. Adobe uses code points U+2329 and U+232A (〈 and 〉), whereas Apple uses U+3008 and U+3009 (〈 and 〉). The characters U+3008 and U+3009 are fullwidth punctuation, usually rendered with additional spacing so as to align them within em squares, as appropriate in East Asian typography. The characters U+2329 and U+232A, however, are canonically equivalent to U+3008 and U+3009, and are therefore changed to the latter under both NFC and NFKC Unicode normalisation. This equivalence is sometimes considered mistaken, but cannot be changed under the Unicode stability policy. For comparison, the fullwidth Latin characters in the Halfwidth and Fullwidth Forms block are mapped to their ASCII equivalents using compatibility mapping, not canonical equivalence, and therefore only changed by NFKC and NFKD normalisation. The alternatives U+27E8 and U+27E9 (⟨ and ⟩) are now preferred for mathematical use.

Symbol (typeface)
	0	1	2	3	4	5	6	7	8	9	A	B	C	D	E	F
0x																
1x																
2x	SP	!	∀ 2200	#	∃ 2203	%	&	∍ 220D	(	)	∗ 2217	+	,	− 2212	.	/
3x	0	1	2	3	4	5	6	7	8	9	:	;	<	=	>	?
4x	≅ 2245	Α 0391	Β 0392	Χ 03A7	Δ 0394	Ε 0395	Φ 03A6	Γ 0393	Η 0397	Ι 0399	ϑ 03D1	Κ 039A	Λ 039B	Μ 039C	Ν 039D	Ο 039F
5x	Π 03A0	Θ 0398	Ρ 03A1	Σ 03A3	Τ 03A4	Υ 03A5	ς 03C2	Ω 03A9	Ξ 039E	Ψ 03A8	Ζ 0396	[	∴ 2234	]	⊥ 22A5	_
6x	‾ (Note: The character at 0x60 does not appear in Unicode. It is described in the Adobe map as "RADICAL EXTENDER", with the Adobe glyph name "radicalex", and is mapped to the PUA code point U+F8E5. It is an over-bar for extending the radical sign over the operands of the radical operator. Some versions of the font implement this as a non-spacing character so that it can be combined (like non-spacing diacritical marks) with the operands it covers. The Unicode overbar character is shown here.)	α 03B1	β 03B2	χ 03C7	δ 03B4	ε 03B5	φ 03C6	γ 03B3	η 03B7	ι 03B9	ϕ 03D5	κ 03BA	λ 03BB	μ 03BC	ν 03BD	ο 03BF
7x	π 03C0	θ 03B8	ρ 03C1	σ 03C3	τ 03C4	υ 03C5	ϖ 03D6	ω 03C9	ξ 03BE	ψ 03C8	ζ 03B6	{	|	}	~	
8x																
9x																
Ax	€ (Note: Before Mac OS 8.5, the character 0xA0 was unassigned. IBM code page 1038 includes a whitespace character specified in this position with mnemonic "NSP" and GCGID SP310000. This GCGID refers to a numeric space (i.e. U+2007); contrast SP300000 for a required space.) 20AC	ϒ 03D2	′ 2032	≤ 2264	/ 2044	∞ 221E	ƒ 0192	♣ 2663	♦ 2666	♥ 2665	♠ 2660	↔ 2194	← 2190	↑ 2191	→ 2192	↓ 2193
Bx	°	±	″ 2033	≥ 2265	× 00D7	∝ 221D	∂ 2202	• 2022	÷ 00F7	≠ 2260	≡ 2261	≈ 2248	… 2026	⏐ 23D0	⎯ 23AF	↵ 21B5
Cx	ℵ 2135	ℑ 2111	ℜ 211C	℘ 2118	⊗ 2297	⊕ 2295	∅ 2205	∩ 2229	∪ 222A	⊃ 2283	⊇ 2287	⊄ 2284	⊂ 2282	⊈ 2288	∈ 2208	∉ 2209
Dx	∠ 2220	∇ 2207	® (Note: The characters ®, ©, and ™ are encoded twice: one version has serifs, the other is sans-serif. The Adobe mapping uses PUA for all six characters to ensure that the presence or absence of serifs is observed, assigning the serif versions to U+F6DA, U+F6D9 and U+F6DB and the sans-serif versions to U+F8E8, U+F8E9 and U+F8EA respectively. The Apple mapping assigns the serif versions to the standard Unicode code points. Earlier versions of the Apple mapping assigned the sans-serif versions to the same codepoints as Adobe, but the current version assigns the sans-serif versions to sequences consisting of the standard codepoints followed by the private use character U+F87F as a "transcoding hint".)	©	™	∏ 220F	√ 221A	⋅ 22C5	¬ 00AC	∧ 2227	∨ 2228	⇔ 21D4	⇐ 21D0	⇑ 21D1	⇒ 21D2	⇓ 21D3
Ex	◊ 25CA	〈 3008	®	©	™	∑ 2211	⎛ 239B	⎜ 239C	⎝ 239D	⎡ 23A1	⎢ 23A2	⎣ 23A3	⎧ 23A7	⎨ 23A8	⎩ 23A9	⎪ 23AA
Fx	(Note: Apple logo, found only in Apple's version (the code point is unused in Adobe's) and in other Apple fonts. The most similar glyph in cross-platform Unicode is U+1F34E 🍎︎ RED APPLE, even though Apple officially uses the PUA character U+F8FF  . Compare the status of the Windows logo in the Wingdings font encoding.)	〉 3009	∫ 222B	⌠ 2320	⎮ 23AE	⌡ 2321	⎞ 239E	⎟ 239F	⎠ 23A0	⎤ 23A4	⎥ 23A5	⎦ 23A6	⎫ 23AB	⎬ 23AC	⎭ 23AD	

== HTML ==
The use of the Symbol font in mathematical expressions was part of a W3C recommendation for HTML 4. At the time of that original recommendation (December 1997), the only native way to display many mathematical symbols in HTML was a direct use of the "Symbol" font. Such explicit references are now strongly discouraged for new documents, but they survive in many existing pages on the Internet. Also, the Symbol font provides graphics that are specifically intended as components in the two-dimensional layout of mathematical expressions. Examples include upper and lower parts of brackets or integral signs and a square-root sign without a vinculum (overline).

Until 2010 or so, the Unicode glyph U+221A corresponding to the square-root sign (the HTML entity is named radic and has decimal code 8730) was usually rendered with a short built-in vinculum. That made it an inadequate graphical replacement for the original character from the Symbol font (itself designed around a slanted line extending all the way to the upper-right corner of the character box, without any spacing). The more recent renditions of the HTML radic entity (U+221A) no longer feature any vinculum and are thus more compatible with the standard graphical representation introduced in the Symbol font. Both styles of the square-root glyph (with or without a short vinculum) have the same disembodied meaning, so the integrity of the Unicode repertoire is not compromised by this adjustment.

Full legacy support of the Symbol font is provided by major modern web browsers like Internet Explorer and Google Chrome. That support involves a specific handling of Adobe's special encoding, which is not properly implemented in at least some versions of other browsers, including Opera, Safari and Firefox. Such browsers do not correctly render legacy HTML documents that make explicit use of the Symbol font.

== See also ==
- Aldo Novarese
- DEC Technical Character Set
- Lotus Multi-Byte Character Set (LMBCS)
- MathTime
