= Penal (disambiguation) =

Penal is a town in Trinidad and Tobago

Penal may also refer to:

- Penal colony
- Penal system, prisons
- Penal military unit

== See also ==
- Penile, to do with the penis
- Penalty (disambiguation)
