= Tonic accent =

Tonic accent may refer to:

- Accent (music)
- Pitch accent (intonation)
