= DEC Special Graphics =

Special graphics used to draw boxes

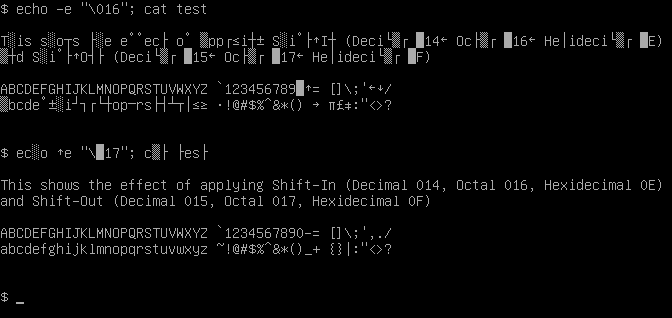
- A modified DEC Special Graphics set (with additional fill blocks and arrows, and without the control pictures) accessed in a Linux terminal using Shift Out
- Alias(es): IBM-1090
- Based on: ASCII

DEC Special Graphics is a 7-bit character set developed by Digital Equipment Corporation. This was used very often to draw boxes on the VT100 video terminal and the many emulators, and used by bulletin board software. The designation escape sequence ESC ( 0 (hexadecimal 1B 28 30) switches the codes for lower-case ASCII letters to draw this set, and the sequence ESC ( B (hexadecimal 1B 28 42) switches back. Alternatively, the sequence ESC ) 0 (hexadecimal 1B 29 42) can be used to set the G1 character set to Special Graphics, and then the single character SO (hexadecimal 0E) can be used to switch to Special Graphics and character SI (hexadecimal 0F) to switch back to ASCII.

IBM calls this character set Code page 1090.

== Character set ==
DEC Special Graphics (gray cells are the same as ASCII)
	0	1	2	3	4	5	6	7	8	9	A	B	C	D	E	F
5_																SP
6_	◆	▒ (Note: In IBM's system of character IDs, this is SV240000, not the SF150000 which is mapped to U+2592 ▒ MEDIUM SHADE in other code pages such as code page 437. The reference glyph for SV240000 differs in showing a chequerboard pattern rather than SF150000's dithered shade. U+1FB95 🮕 CHECKER BOARD FILL, in the much more recently added Symbols for Legacy Computing block, is explicitly a chequerboard shade. In the specification for IBM Japanese Host code, SV240080 (i.e. SV240000 with the fullwidth attribute set) is mapped to U+25A6 ▦ SQUARE WITH ORTHOGONAL CROSSHATCH FILL; however, the reference glyph given there for SV240080 differs from that of SV240000.)	␉	␌	␍	␊	°	±	␤	␋	┘	┐	┌	└	┼	⎺
7_	⎻	─ (Note: The Unicode code chart for the range U+23BA through U+23BD (the scan lines before and after this character) explicitly notes that "scan line-5 is unified with the box-drawing graphic character 2500".)	⎼	⎽	├	┤	┴	┬	│	≤	≥	π	≠	£	·	

== See also ==
- Box-drawing character
- DEC Multinational Character Set (MCS)
- DEC National Replacement Character Set (NRCS)
- DEC Technical Character Set
- DEC VT100
