= Radical symbol =

Mathematical symbol denoting a root

√o

Radical symbol
- In Unicode: U+221A √ SQUARE ROOT (&radic;, &Sqrt;)

Related
- See also: U+2713 ✓ CHECK MARK

In mathematics, the radical symbol, radical sign, root symbol, or surd is a symbol for the square root or higher-order root of a number. The square root of a number $x$ is written as $\sqrt{x},$ while the $n$th root of $x$ is written as $\sqrt[n]{x}.$ It is also used for other meanings in more advanced mathematics, such as the radical of an ideal.

In linguistics, the symbol is used to denote a root word.

== Principal square root ==
Each positive real number has two square roots, one positive and the other negative. The radical symbol refers to the principal value of the square root function called the principal square root, which is the positive one. The two square roots of a negative number are both imaginary numbers, and the square root symbol refers to the principal square root, the one with a positive imaginary part. For the definition of the principal square root of other complex numbers, see Square root § Principal square root of a complex number.

== Origin ==
The origin of the root symbol √ is largely speculative. Some sources imply that the symbol was first used by Arab mathematicians. One of those mathematicians was Abū al-Hasan ibn Alī al-Qalasādī (1421–1486). Legend has it that it was taken from the Arabic letter "ج" (ǧīm), which is the first letter in the Arabic word "جذر" (jadhir, meaning "root"). However, Leonhard Euler believed it originated from the letter "r", the first letter of the Latin word "radix" (meaning "root"), referring to the same mathematical operation.

The symbol was first seen in print without the vinculum (the horizontal "bar" over the numbers inside the radical symbol) in the year 1525 in Die Coss by Christoff Rudolff, a German mathematician. In 1637 Descartes was the first to unite the German radical sign √ with the vinculum to create the radical symbol in common use today.

== Encoding ==
The Unicode and HTML character codes for the radical symbols are:

- U+221A √ SQUARE ROOT (&radic;, &Sqrt;)
- U+221B ∛ CUBE ROOT
- U+221C ∜ FOURTH ROOT
- U+23B7 ⎷ RADICAL SYMBOL BOTTOM

However, these characters differ in appearance from most mathematical typesetting by omitting the overline connected to the radical symbol, which surrounds the argument of the square root function. The OpenType math table allows adding this overline following the radical symbol.

The Symbol font displays the character without any vinculum whatsoever; the overline may be a separate character at 0x60. The JIS, Wansung and CNS 11643 code charts include a short overline attached to the radical symbol, whereas the GB 2312 and GB 18030 charts do not.

Additionally a "Radical Symbol Bottom" (U+23B7, ⎷) is available in the Miscellaneous Technical block. This was used in contexts where box-drawing characters are used, such as in the technical character set of DEC terminals, to join up with box drawing characters on the line above to create the vinculum.

In LaTeX the square root symbol may be generated by the \sqrt macro, and the square root symbol without the overline may be generated by the \surd macro.

=== Legacy encodings ===
Legacy encodings of the square root character U+221A include:

- 0xC3 in Mac OS Roman and Mac OS Cyrillic
- 0xFB (Alt+251) in Code page 437 and Code page 866 (but not Code page 850) on DOS and the Windows console
- 0xD6 in the Symbol font encoding
- 02-69 (7-bit 0x2265, SJIS 0x81E3, EUC 0xA2E5) in Japanese JIS X 0208
- 01-78 (EUC/UHC 0xA1EE) in Korean Wansung code
- 01-44 (EUC 0xA1CC) in Mainland Chinese GB 2312 or GBK
- Traditional Chinese: 0xA1D4 in Big5 or 1-2235 (kuten 01-02-21, EUC 0xA2B5 or 0x8EA1A2B5) in CNS 11643

== See also ==
- Solution in radicals
