= Œ =

Ligature of the Latin letters O and E

- Œ œ ɶ

Usage
- Writing system: Latin script
- Type: Alphabetic
- Language of origin: Latin
- Sound values: [œ]; [ø]; [ɛ]; [e]; [i]
- In Unicode: U+0152; U+0153; U+0276

History
- Development: OE oe: Œ œ ɶ

Other
- Writing direction: Left-to-right

The word onomatopoeia with the œ ligature

Œ (minuscule: œ), known as ethel or œthel, (Note: Also called ēðel, odal.) is a Latin-script character. It is a ligature of o and e. In medieval and early modern Latin, it was used in borrowings from Greek that originally contained the diphthong οι, and in a few non-Greek words. These usages continue in English and French. In French, the words that were borrowed from Latin and contained the Latin diphthong written as œ now generally have é or è; but œ is still used in some non-learned French words, representing open-mid front rounded vowels, such as œil ('eye') and sœur ('sister').

It is used in the modern orthography for Old West Norse and is used in the International Phonetic Alphabet to represent the open-mid front rounded vowel. In English runology, ⟨œ⟩ is used to transliterate the rune othala ᛟ (Old English: ēðel, 'country, native land, home').

== Languages ==
=== Latin ===
Classical Latin wrote the o and e separately (as has today again become the general practice), but the ligature was used by medieval and early modern writings, in part because the diphthongal sound had, by Late Latin, merged into the sound [e]. The classical diphthong had the value [oe̯], similar to (standard) English oi as in choice. It occurs most often in borrowings from Greek, rendering that language's οι (in majuscule ΟΙ), although it is also used in some native words such as coepi 'I began'.

=== French ===
In French, œ is called e dans l'o [ə dɑ̃ lo], which means e in the o (a mnemotechnic pun used first at school, sounding like (des) œufs dans l'eau, meaning eggs in water) or sometimes o et e collés, (literally o and e glued) and is a true linguistic ligature, not just a typographic one (like the fi or fl ligatures), reflecting etymology. In Canadian French, the names o-e liés ("linked O and E") or lettre double œ (where O and E are pronounced separately for clarity) are used officially. Œ is most prominent in the words mœurs ('mores'), cœur ('heart'), chœur ('choir'), sœur ('sister'), œuf ('egg'), bœuf ('beef, steer'), œuvre ('work') and œil ('eye'), in which the digraph œu, like eu, represents the sound [œ] (in other cases, like plurals œufs ('eggs') and bœufs ('steers'), it stands for [ø]).

French also uses œ in direct borrowings from Latin and Greek. So, "coeliac" in French is cœliaque, "fetus / foetus" is fœtus and "Oedipus" is Œdipe. In such cases, the œ is classically pronounced [e], or, sometimes, in modern pronunciation, [œ]. In some words, like phénix and économique, the etymological œ is changed to é.

In French placenames or family names of Germanic origin (mostly in and around Alsace-Lorraine, historically Germanic-speaking areas that have changed hands between France and Germany (or Prussia before 1871) a number of times), œ replaces German ö and is pronounced [œ]. Examples include Schœneck (Moselle), Kœtzingue (Haut-Rhin), and Hœrdt (Bas-Rhin) for placenames, or Schœlcher (as in Victor Schœlcher) for surnames.

In all cases, œ is alphabetized as oe, rather than as a separate letter.

When oe occurs in French without the ligature, it is pronounced /wa/ or sometimes /wɛ/, just like words spelt with oi. The most common words of this type are poêle ('stove, frying pan') and moelleux ('soft'). Poêle is itself an etymological spelling, with the ê reflecting its derivation from Latin patella. If the oe is not to be pronounced thus, then a diaeresis, acute or grave accent needs to be added in order to indicate that the vowels should be pronounced separately. For example, Noël, poésie, poète. The exception to this rule is when a morpheme ending in o is joined to one beginning in e, as in électroencéphalogramme, or with the prefix co-, which is always pronounced /ko/ in hiatus with the following vowel, as in coefficient ('ratio, coefficient').

=== Lombard ===
In Lombard, œ is used in some orthographies, often in the digraph œu (or oeu), representing /ø/, for example in the word genœucc 'knee' in the classical Milanese orthography, or fœr in the Scriver Lombard orthography.

=== English ===
A number of words written with œ were borrowed from French and from Latin into English, where the œ is now rarely written. Modern American English spelling usually substitutes œ with e, so diarrhœa has become diarrhea, although there are some exceptions, such as phoenix. In modern British English, the spellings generally keep the o but remove the ligature (e.g. diarrhoea).

The œ ~ oe ~ e is traditionally pronounced as "short Ĕ" /ɛ/, as "long Ē" /iː/, or as an (unrounded) unstressed vowel. These three Modern-English values interchange with one another in consistent ways, just as do the values within each of the sets from the other vowel-spellings that at the Middle English stage likewise represented non-diphthongs — except for, as was recognised particularly in certain positions by Dobson a tendency whereby

... long vowels are, in later use, often substituted ... cf. Pres(ent-Day) E(nglish) [iːkənɒmik] 'economic' in place of the popular [ekənɒmik], which (latter) is in accord with the normal rules and must be regarded as the traditional and naturally-developed pronunciation ...

There are a few words that English has recently borrowed from contemporary French. The pronunciation of these English words is generally an approximation of that of the French word (the French use [œ] or [ø] in terms of the International Phonetic Alphabet). English-speakers use a variety of substitutions for these sounds. The words involved include manœuvre, hors d'œuvre, œuvre, and œil de bœuf.

However, most œ words use the traditional English pronunciation of borrowings from/via pre-modern French and from/via Latin. Examples are listed in the following categories, into which they have been divided by developments in our pronunciation since Middle English.

- An overriding rule is that where œ ~ oe ~ e is followed by another vowel (whatever the position(s) of stress(es) in the word), it is pronounced as a long Ē (/iː/).

Examples: onomatopœic, onomatopœia, dyspnœa, apnœa, amenorrhœa, diarrhœa, logorrhœa, Eubœa, Bœotia, homœosis, homœopathy; homœopath; homœopathic, homœostatic, homœostasis, homœozoic, homœomorphic, and homœomorphism.

- In open syllables immediately following or preceding a syllable that bears primary or secondary stress, an œ ~ oe ~ e is pronounced as an (unrounded) unstressed vowel, as in the short Ĭ (/ɪ/) or Schwa-like sound (/ə/). Alternatively, especially when clearer enunciation is desired, an additional (secondary) stress can be added, resulting in a long Ē (/iː/).

Examples: tragœdy, (arch)diœcese; œconomisation, œsophageal; œsophagus, œcologist, œcology, œconomise, œconomist, œconomy, œdema, œnologist, œnology, ..., pœnology, and Phœnician.

- A long Ē (/iː/) can be used for œ ~ oe ~ e in a primary stressed open syllable that lies within the final two syllables of the word (not counting suffixes such as -es and -ing, even if they are syllabic, and lexical suffixes like -cide if they do not affect the pronunciation of the rest of the word).

Examples: subpœna(ing), phœnix(es), (fœticide, which belongs in this category if the first vowel is pronounced as long Ē (/iː/) due to carry-over from the next word,) fœtus, Phœbe, fœtor, pœnal, Crœsus, and amœba.

- A long Ē (/iː/) is used for œ ~ oe ~ e in primary-stressed open syllables that lie in the third-to-final position (antepenultimate syllables) if the final syllable begins with a vowel and the penultimate (second-to-last) ends in a vowel other than o or u (or did prior to a blending of that vowel with the preceding consonant).

Examples: cœliac and Mœsia(n), which (depending on the dialect) equal /ˈsiːliæk/ and /ˈmiːʒə(n)/ ~ /ˈmiːʃə(n)/ ~ /ˈmiːsiə(n)/~/ˈmiːziə(n)/.

- Finally, there are some cases where a short Ĕ /ɛ/ is used, as what Dobson called in the quote above the "naturally-developed pronunciation" though "the long vowels are, in later use, often substituted":
1. for an œ ~ oe ~ e lying in a secondarily-stressed (open or closed) syllable not adjacent to the primary-stressed one, as in (con)fœderation, œcologic(al)(ly), œconomic(al)(ly), œcumenical(ly) and œstrogenic;
2. for an œ ~ oe ~ e in a closed syllable anywhere as long as it bears some stress (so this overlaps with the preceding category), as in œstrogenic, œstrogen, œstral and œstrus;
3. for an œ ~ oe ~ e in a primary-stressed syllable that does not lie within the final two syllables of the word (except for words like cœliac and Mœsia(n), see above).

Examples: Confœderates, (con)fœderate (adj.), to (con)fœderate, fœderal(ly), Œdipal, Œdipus, pœnalty and fœtid.

The likes of fœ̯tid, though superficially exceptional here, do indeed belong here in this category because the counting properly includes also final -e that has gone silent since Middle English (and therefore has been left out by some spellings) in those situations where speakers before the -e's demise, such as Chaucer (who did not drop it in rhymes), would have had the -e as an intrinsic part of the word (rather than as just a suffix) — save for its regularly disappearing where followed with no pause by a word beginning with a vowel or sometimes /h/.

As less circumstantial evidence (than this word's modern short Ĕ /ɛ/) that it contained the final -e, consider both the spelling of its earliest attestation in English recorded by the NED, within "It maketh to blister both handes, & feet, out of which issueth foetide, and stinckinge water." (in a text dating to 1599). And from the immediate ancestor of the word, lying between it and Latin's fœtidus, -a, -um, namely, Anglo-Norman fetide, attested 13th century. (Note: In medical texts find: "pissade", "fetide", "laureole"; "spatule fetide"; (the source text that can be most narrowly dated is a manuscript of Roger of Salerno (c. 1240) Chirurgia). — within parallels that English has to the fœtid, such as acid, arid, avid, placid, rabid, rapid, sapid, squalid, valid, vapid; gelid, intrepid, tepid; frigid, insipid, liquid, livid, rigid, timid, viscid, vivid; florid, solid, and stolid. The stressed syllable's vowel likewise has its short value. Or rather, had one of its short values, in the special case where either a preceding /w/ or a following /r/ has created a special short value. Consider squalid, florid, and / or arid in certain dialects: The syllable did not lie in one of the word's two final syllables – as is straightforwardly shown for these words by comparing their cognate French spellings: aride, avide, insipide, liquide, livide, etc. Whether the word contained a final -e does not matter for the parallels whose stressed syllable had (not a monophthong but) a diphthong. That includes words such as humid, lurid, lucid, pellucid, putrid, stupid, and tumid, since Middle English dialects save in the Southwest had lost the vowel-sound [y] from their sound-systems, and so the Middle-English ancestors of our Modern-Standard dialects used in any open syllable as closest approximation to that sound of the French the diphthong which they spelled in non-Romance words as iw or similar. Because of using a Middle-English diphthong, distance from word-end did not cause the sound to vary.) Dobson notes however: "... that this was the only development is difficult, though not impossible, to reconcile with the rarity, in the fourteenth century, of the inverted spelling u(e) for the native diphthong [iu] and with the fact that cultivated poets like Chaucer and Gower rhyme O[ld ]Fr[ench] [y] with native [iu] relatively seldom, especially considering the usefulness of such rhymes, therefore suggests that in cultivated speech the pronunciation [y:] was maintained.")

=== Other Germanic languages ===
Old Norse

Œ is used in the modern scholarly orthography of Old West Norse, representing the long vowel /øː/, contrasting with ø, which represents the short vowel /ø/. Sometimes, the ǿ is used instead for Old West Norse, maintaining consistency with the designation of the length of the other vowels, e.g. mǿðr "mothers".

Middle High German

Œ is also used to express long /øː/ in the modern scholarly orthography of Middle High German. It contrasts ö, pronounced as a short /œ/.

(Modern) German

Œ is not used in modern German. Loanwords using œ are generally rendered ö, e.g. Ösophagus. A common exception is the French word Œuvre and its compounds (e.g. Œuvreverzeichnis). It remains used in Swiss German, especially in the names of people and places.

Danish

Œ is not used in Danish, just like German, but unlike German, Danish replaces œ or œu in loan-words with ø, as in økonomi "economy" from Greek via Latin œconomia or bøf "beef" from French bœuf. œ, mainly lowercase, has historically been used as a typeface alternative to æ in Danish.

== Transcription ==
The symbol [œ] is used in the International Phonetic Alphabet (IPA) for the open-mid front rounded vowel. This sound resembles the "œu" in the French œuf or the "ö" in the German öffnen. These contrast with French feu and German schön, which have the close-mid front rounded vowel, [ø].

The small capital variant [ɶ] represents the open front rounded vowel in the IPA. Modifier letter small ligature oe (ꟹ) is used in extensions to the International Phonetic Alphabet.

U+107A3 𐞣 MODIFIER LETTER SMALL CAPITAL OE is used as an IPA superscript letter.

The Uralic Phonetic Alphabet (UPA) includes U+1D14 ᴔ LATIN SMALL LETTER TURNED OE.

The Teuthonista phonetic transcription system uses several related symbols:

- ꭀ U+AB40 ꭀ LATIN SMALL LETTER INVERTED OE
- ꭁ U+AB41 ꭁ LATIN SMALL LETTER TURNED OE WITH STROKE
- ꭂ U+AB42 ꭂ LATIN SMALL LETTER TURNED OE WITH HORIZONTAL STROKE

The Voice Quality Symbol for oesophageal speech is Œ.

== Encodings ==
In Unicode, the characters are encoded at U+0152 Œ LATIN CAPITAL LIGATURE OE (&OElig;) and U+0153 œ LATIN SMALL LIGATURE OE (&oelig;). In ISO-8859-15, Œ is 0xBC and œ/ɶ 0xBD. In Windows-1252, at positions 0x8C and 0x9C. In Mac-Roman, they are at positions 0xCE and 0xCF.

Œ and œ/ɶ were omitted from ISO-8859-1 (as well as derived standards, such as IBM code page 850), which are still widespread in internet protocols and applications. Œ is the only character in modern French that is not included in ISO-8859-1, and this has led to it becoming replaced by 'oe' in many computer-assisted publications (including printed magazines and newspapers). This was due, in part, to the lack of available characters in the French ISO/IEC 646 version that was used earlier for computing. Another reason is that œ is absent from most French keyboards, and as a result, few people know how to input it.

The above-mentioned small capital of the International Phonetic Alphabet is encoded at U+0276 ɶ LATIN LETTER SMALL CAPITAL OE.

== See also ==
- Å
- Ä
- Ø
- Ö
- Æ
- Oe (digraph)
- list of English words that may be spelled with a ligature

== Bibliography ==
- De Wilde, G. et al., eds. "Anglo-Norman Dictionary". Accessed 4 April 2017.
- Dobson, E. J. English Pronunciation 1500-1700. 2 vols. Oxford: The Clarendon Press, 1957; 2nd ed., 1968.
- Jordan, Richard. Handbuch der mittenglischen Grammatik, I. Teil: Lautlehre. Heidelberg: Carl Winter's Universitätsbuchhandlung, 1925.
- Murray, James A. H. et al., eds. A New English Dictionary Founded on Historical Principles: Founded Mainly on the Materials Collected by the Philological Society. 10 vols + an 11th which contains "Introduction, Supplement, and Bibliography". London: Henry Frowde, 1887–1933.
