= Í =

Latin letter I with acute accent

Latin I with acute

Í (minuscule: í), known as I-acute, is a Latin-script character composed of the letter I and an acute accent. It is found in the Faroese, Hungarian, Icelandic, Karakalpak, Dobrujan Tatar, Czech, and Slovak languages, where it often indicates a long /i/ vowel (ee in English word feel). This form also appears in Catalan, Irish, Italian, Occitan, Portuguese, Spanish, Aragonese, Galician, Leonese, Navajo, and Vietnamese language as a variant of the letter "i". In Latin, the long i ⟨ꟾ⟩ is used instead of ⟨í⟩ for a long i-vowel.

== Usage in various languages ==
=== Chinese ===
In Chinese pinyin, í is the yángpíng tone (阳平, high-rising tone) of “i”.

=== Dobrujan Tatar ===
Í is the 12th letter of the Dobrujan Tatar alphabet, represents the hight unrounded half-advanced ATR or soft vowel /ɨ/ as in "bír" [b̶ɨr̶] 'one'. At the end of the word it is pronounced with half open mouth undergoing dilatation "Keñiytúw" and becoming mid unrounded half-advanced ATR or soft /ə/, also known as schwa, as in "tílí" [t̶ɨl̶ə] 'his tongue'.

=== Faroese ===
Í is the 11th letter of the Faroese alphabet and represents /ʊi/.

=== Hungarian, Icelandic, Irish, Czech and Slovak ===
Í is the 16th letter of the Hungarian alphabet, the 12th letter of the Icelandic alphabet, the 16th letter of the Czech alphabet and the 18th letter of the Slovak alphabet. It represents /iː/. In Icelandic it is often pronounced as a short vowel.

=== Ibero-Romance & Italian ===
In Ibero-Romance languages, the "í" is not considered a letter, but the letter "i" with an accent. It is used to denote an "i" syllable with abnormal stress. In Italian, "Í"/"í" is a rare variant of "I"/"i" carrying an acute accent; it represents an /i/ carrying the tonic accent. Instead of it, the "i" with a grave (ì, Ì) is almost always used (e.g. lunedì, "Monday"). It is used only if it is the last letter of the word, except in dictionaries or when a different pronunciation may affect the meaning of a word: víola (but normally vìola, "violates", pronounced [ˈviːola]) and viòla ("violet", pronounced [vi'ɔːla]).

=== Karakalpak ===
Í is the 13th letter of the Karakalpak alphabet. It represents /ɯ/. Its preferred lowercase form is ⟨ı⟩.

=== Vietnamese ===
In Vietnamese alphabet, í is the sắc tone (high-rising tone) of “i”.

== Character mappings ==
Character information
Preview	Í		í	
Unicode name	LATIN CAPITAL LETTER I WITH ACUTE		LATIN SMALL LETTER I WITH ACUTE	
Encodings	decimal	hex	dec	hex
Unicode	205	U+00CD	237	U+00ED
UTF-8	195 141	C3 8D	195 173	C3 AD
Numeric character reference	&#205;	&#xCD;	&#237;	&#xED;
Named character reference	&Iacute;		&iacute;	

== See also ==
- Acute accent
