= Ú =

Latin letter U with acute accent

Latin letter U with acute

Ú (minuscule: ú), known as U-acute, is a Latin-script character composed of the letter U and an acute accent. It is found in the Czech, Dobrujan Tatar, Faroese, Hungarian, Icelandic, Karakalpak and Slovak writing systems. This letter also appears in Dutch, Frisian, Irish, Occitan, Catalan, Pinyin, Portuguese, Spanish, Italian, Galician, and Vietnamese as a variant of the letter "U".

== Usage in various languages ==
=== Czech ===
Ú/ú is the 34th letter of the Czech alphabet and represents a /uː/ sound. It is usually the first letter of a word, as in úhel 'angle'. If the sound is in the middle of the word, the letter ⟨ů⟩ is used instead, as in kůň 'horse'. Exceptionally, ⟨ú⟩ in the middle is written in compound words, such as trojúhelník triangle, in old words, such as ocún 'colchicum', Kúsky, and in loanwords, such as Bejrút 'Beirut', Rút 'Ruth', múza 'muse', manikúra 'manicure', pedikúra 'pedicure', štrúdl 'strudel'.

=== Dobrujan Tatar ===
Ú/ú is the 28th letter of Dobrujan Tatar alphabet, represents the hight rounded half-advanced ATR or soft vowel /ʉ/ as in "sút" [s̶ʉt̶] 'milk'. In the vicinity of semivowel y, which occurs rarely, its articulation shifts to high rounded ATR or soft /y/, close to Turkish pronunciation, as in "súymek" [s̶ym̶ec] 'to love'.

=== Faroese ===
Ú/ú is the 24th letter of the Faroese alphabet, and may represent the following sounds:

- Short [ʏ] in such words as krúss [kɹʏsː] ("mug", "coffee cup")
- Short [ɪ] before /ɡv/ in such words as kúgv [kɪɡv] ("cow"), but also in brúdleyp [bɹɪdlɛip] ("bridal")
- Long [ʉu] diphthong in úti [ʉuːtɪ] ("out"), hús [hʉuːs] ("house"), jú [jʉuː] ("but"),

=== Hungarian ===
Ú/ú is the 36th letter of the Hungarian alphabet and represents a /uː/ sound.

=== Icelandic ===
Ú/ú is the 25th letter of the Icelandic alphabet, and represents a /uː/ sound.

=== Javanese ===
Ú/ú is the letter of the Javanese Latin alphabet, and represents a /ʊ/ sound.

=== Kazakh ===
It was proposed in 2018 that Ú/ú should be one of its Latin script, it should represent the near-close front rounded vowel (ʏ) and is used to replace Cyrillic Ү. The replacement is modified to be Ü ü in 2020.

=== Karakalpak ===
Ú/ú is the 26th letter of the Karakalpak alphabet and represents near-close front rounded vowel.

=== Slovak ===
Ú/ú is the 39th letter of the Slovak alphabet and represents a /uː/ sound.

=== Portuguese/Galician/Spanish/Catalan ===
In Portuguese, Galician, Spanish and Catalan, "ú" is not a distinct letter but a modified letter "u". It is used to denote an "u" with unusual stress.

=== Italian ===
Ú/ú is a variant of U carrying an acute accent; it represents an /u/ carrying the tonic accent. It is used only if it is the last letter of the word except in dictionaries. In Italian, Ú/ú is orthographically equivalent to Ù/ù; predominantly the latter is used.

== Character encoding ==
Character information
Preview	Ú		ú	
Unicode name	LATIN CAPITAL LETTER U WITH ACUTE		LATIN SMALL LETTER U WITH ACUTE	
Encodings	decimal	hex	dec	hex
Unicode	218	U+00DA	250	U+00FA
UTF-8	195 154	C3 9A	195 186	C3 BA
Numeric character reference	&#218;	&#xDA;	&#250;	&#xFA;
Named character reference	&Uacute;		&uacute;	
EBCDIC family	254	FE	222	DE
ISO 8859-1/2/3/4/9/10/14/15/16	218	DA	250	FA

== See also ==
- Acute accent
