= Á =

Latin letter A with acute accent

- Á á

Usage
- Type: alphabetic
- Language of origin: Pinyin, Blackfoot language, Czech language, Chipewyan language Dobrujan Tatar language, Dutch language, Faroese language, Northern Sámi language, Welsh language, Hungarian language, Irish language, Icelandic language, Lingala, Occitan language, Slovak language, Vietnamese language
- Sound values: [aː], [ɑː], [ɑ], [au̯], [æ]

Other
- Writing direction: left-to-right

Á (minuscule: á), known as A-acute, is a Latin-script character. It is composed of the letter A and an acute accent.

== Usage ==
In addition to the below, the letter is used to write Blackfoot, Galician, Lakota, Navajo, Occitan, Sámi, and Western Apache.

=== Chinese ===
In Chinese pinyin, á is the yángpíng tone (陽平/阳平 "high-rising tone") of "a".

=== Czech ===
Á is the 2nd letter of the Czech alphabet and represents the sound /aː/.

=== Dobrujan Tatar ===
Á is the 2nd letter of the Dobrujan Tatar alphabet, represents the near-low unrounded ATR or soft vowel /æ/ as in "sáát" [s̶ææt̶] 'hour', 'clock'.

=== Dutch ===
In Dutch, the Á is used to put emphasis on an "a", either in a long "a" form like in háár ("hair"), or in a short form like in kán (the verb "can").

=== Faroese ===
Á is the 2nd letter of the Faroese alphabet and represents /ɔ/ or /ɔaː/.

=== Filipino ===
In Filipino, á is an accented letter and has no direct equivalent other than a. An example is the first "a" as in "baka" ("cow") and "tatawid" ("to cross").

=== Hungarian ===
Á is the second letter of the Hungarian alphabet representing /aː/.

=== Icelandic ===
Á is the second letter of the Icelandic alphabet and represents /au̯/ (as in "ow").

=== Irish ===
In Irish, á is called a fada ("long a"), pronounced [aː] and appears in words such as slán ("goodbye"). It is the only diacritic used in Modern Irish, since the decline of the dot above many letters in the Irish language. Fada is only used on vowel letters i.e. á, é, í, ó, ú. It symbolises a lengthening of the vowel.

=== Karakalpak ===
Á is the second letter of the latin-script version of the Karakalpak alphabet and represents /æ/.

=== Kazakh ===
In the 2018 amends of Kazakh alphabet list, Á is defined as the second letter and represents /æ/. It was replaced by Ä ä in the 2019 amends, and matches Cyrillic alphabet Ә, 2017 version Aʼ and Arabic ٵ.

=== Portuguese ===
In the Portuguese alphabet, á is used to mark a stressed /a/ in words whose stressed syllable is in an abnormal location within the word, as in lá (there) and rápido (rapid, fast). If the location of the stressed syllable is predictable, the acute accent is not used. Á /a/ contrasts with â, pronounced /ɐ/.

=== Scottish Gaelic ===
Á was once used in Scottish Gaelic, but has now been largely superseded by à. It can still be seen in certain writings, but it is no longer used in standard orthography.

=== Slovak ===
Á is the 2nd letter in the Slovak alphabet and it represents /aː/.

=== Spanish ===
In Spanish, á is an accented letter. There is no alphabetical or phonological difference between a and á; both sound like /a/, both are considered the same letter, and both have the same value in the Spanish alphabetical order. The accent indicates the stressed syllable in words with irregular stress patterns (ones where the stress is not on the penultimate syllable.) It can also be used to "break up" a diphthong or to avoid what would otherwise be homonyms, although this does not happen with á, because a is a strong vowel and usually does not become a semivowel in a diphthong. See Diacritic and Acute accent for more details.

=== Vietnamese ===
In the Vietnamese alphabet, á is the sắc tone (high-rising tone) of a. "Á", as a shorthand for "châu Á", is also the Vietnamese word for "Asia".

=== Welsh ===
In Welsh, word stress usually falls on the penultimate syllable, but one way of indicating stress on a final (short) vowel is through the use of the acute accent. The acute accent on a is often found in verbal nouns and borrowed words, for example, casáu [kaˈsaɨ̯, kaˈsai̯] "to hate", caniatáu [kanjaˈtaɨ̯, kanjaˈtai̯] "to allow", carafán [karaˈvan] "caravan".

== Unicode ==
- U+00C1 Á LATIN CAPITAL LETTER A WITH ACUTE
- U+00E1 á LATIN SMALL LETTER A WITH ACUTE
