= Ù =

Latin letter U with grave accent

Ù ù

U with grave in Doulos SIL

Ù is a letter of the Latin script. It is used in the ISO 9:1995 system of Kyrgyz transliteration as the Cyrillic letter Ү.

In the Pinyin system of Chinese romanization ù is an u with a falling tone.

This appears in Cassubian, Italian, Sardinian, French, Breton, Kurdish, Vietnamese, Scottish Gaelic and also in the constructed language Uropi to represent a close back rounded vowel.

== Unicode ==
- U+00D9 Ù LATIN CAPITAL LETTER U WITH GRAVE
- U+00F9 ù LATIN SMALL LETTER U WITH GRAVE

== See also ==
- Grave accent
