= Ê =

Latin letter E with circumflex

E with circumflex
- Ê ê

Usage
- Writing system: Latin script
- Type: alphabetic
- Sound values: [ɛ]; [ɛː]; [ɛ̂]; [æː]; [e]; [eː]; [je]
- In Unicode: U+00CA, U+00EA

History
Development
A28
        - Ε ε ϵ
          - 𐌄
            - E e
              - Ê ê
- Transliterations: Єє

Ê, ê (e-circumflex) is a letter of the Latin alphabet, found in Afrikaans, French, Friulian, Kurdish, Norwegian (Nynorsk), Portuguese, Vietnamese, and Welsh. It is used to transliterate Chinese and Ukrainian.

== Usage in various languages ==
=== Afrikaans ===
Ê is not considered a separate letter in Afrikaans but a variation of "E". The circumflex changes the pronunciation of "e" to be /ɛː/ (or /æː/ if the succeeding consonant is either a dorsal or a liquid)

=== Chinese ===
In the Pinyin romanization of Standard Mandarin Chinese, ê represents /ɛ/. It corresponds to Zhuyin ㄝ. The circumflex occurs only if ê is the only vowel in a syllable: ề /ɛ̂/ (诶; 誒; "eh!"). Without the circumflex, e as the only vowel represents /ɤ/: è /ɤ̂/ (饿; 餓; "hungry"). Elsewhere, /ɛ/ is written as a (after i or ü before n) or e (before or after another vowel), with the appropriate tone mark: xiān /ɕi̯ɛ́n/ (先; "first"), xuǎn /ɕy̯ɛ̀n/ (选; 選; "to choose", noting that ü is written u after x), xué /ɕy̯ɛ̌ ~ ɕy̯ě/ (学; 學; "to learn"), xièxie /ɕi̯ɛ̂.ɕi̯ɛ ~ ɕi̯ê.ɕi̯e/ (谢谢; 謝謝; "thanks").

In Pe̍h-ōe-jī, ê is the fifth tone of e: ê (个; 個; possessive, adjectival suffix, classifier for things).

=== French ===
Diacritics are not considered to be distinct letters of the French alphabet. In French, ê usually changes the pronunciation of e from /ə/ to /ɛ/. It is used instead of "è" for words that used to be written with e + another letter (usually an s).

=== Friulian ===
Ê represents /eː/ and /ɛː/.

=== Khmer ===
Ê is used in UNGEGN romanization system for Khmer to represent /ae/ and /ɛː/, for example Khmêr (ខ្មែរ [kʰmae]) and Dângrêk Mountains (ដងរែក [ɗɑːŋrɛːk]).

=== Kurdish ===
Ê is the 7th letter of the Kurdish Kurmanji alphabet and represents /eː/.

=== Norwegian Nynorsk ===
In Nynorsk, ê is used to represent the reduction of the Old Norse sequence ⟨eð⟩, similar to the use of ê for the historical sequence ⟨es⟩ in French. It is mostly used to differentiate words which otherwise would be spelled the same, e.g. vêr 'weather' and ver, imperative of 'to be'.

=== Portuguese ===
In Portuguese, ê marks a stressed /e/ only in words whose stressed syllable is in an otherwise unpredictable location in the word: "pêssego" (peach). The letter, pronounced /e/, can also contrast with é, pronounced /ɛ/, as in pé (foot).

In Brazilian Portuguese, ê also used on final syllable of the root word e.g. Guinê-Bissau ("Guinea-Bissau").

=== Tibetan ===
Ê is used in Tibetan pinyin to represent /e/, for example Gêrzê County.

=== Ukrainian ===
Ê is used in the ISO 9:1995 system of Ukrainian transliteration as the letter Є.

=== Vietnamese ===
Ê is the 9th letter of the Vietnamese alphabet and represents /e/. In Vietnamese phonology, diacritics can be added to form five forms to represent five tones of ê:

- Ề ề
- Ể ể
- Ễ ễ
- Ế ế
- Ệ ệ

=== Welsh ===
In Welsh, ê represents long stressed e [eː] if the vowel would otherwise be pronounced as short [ɛ]: llên [ɬeːn] "literature", as opposed to llen [ɬɛn] "curtain", or gêm [ɡeːm] "game", as opposed to gem [ɡɛm] "gem, jewel". That is useful for borrowed words with a final stress like apêl [apˈeːl] "appeal".

=== Other ===
In Popido, a fictitious dialect of Esperanto made by Manuel Halvelik for use in literature, ê represents /ə/. It is only used epenthetically to break consonant clusters, especially before grammatical suffixes.

== Character mappings ==
Character information
Preview	Ê		ê	
Unicode name	LATIN CAPITAL LETTER E WITH CIRCUMFLEX		LATIN SMALL LETTER E WITH CIRCUMFLEX	
Encodings	decimal	hex	dec	hex
Unicode	202	U+00CA	234	U+00EA
UTF-8	195 138	C3 8A	195 170	C3 AA
Numeric character reference	&#202;	&#xCA;	&#234;	&#xEA;
Named character reference	&Ecirc;		&ecirc;	

Unicode also encodes five pairs of precomposed characters with compounded diacritis (Ề / ề, Ể / ể, Ễ / ễ, Ế / ế, Ệ / ệ) for the five tones of ê in Vietnamese. Two pairs of the five (Ế / ế and Ề / ề) can also be used as the second and fourth tones of ê in Pinyin. The first and third tones of ê in Pinyin have to be written using combining diacritical marks. (Note: like ê̄ and ê̌, using ê&amp;#304x; and ê&amp;#30Cx; (U+0304 ◌̄ COMBINING MACRON and U+030C ◌̌ COMBINING CARON).)

== See also ==
- Circumflex
