= Ï =

Latin letter I with dieresis

I with Diaeresis
- Ï ï

Usage
- Writing system: Latin script
- Sound values: [ɯ]; [ɛ]; [i]; [ɨ]; [ɪ]; [ˈiː]
- In Unicode: U+00CF, U+00EF

History
- Development: IE: Iͤ; I: Ï ï

Ï (minuscule: ï) is a Latin-script character. It is composed by the letter I and two dots above, which can be considered a diaeresis. In some languages, it is considered a letter separate from I.

Initially in French and also in Afrikaans, Catalan, Dutch, Galician, Southern Sami, Welsh, Purépecha, and rarely English, ⟨ï⟩ is used when ⟨i⟩ follows another vowel and indicates hiatus in the pronunciation of such a word. It indicates that the two vowels are pronounced in separate syllables, rather than together as a diphthong or digraph. For example, French maïs (IPA: [ma.is]; "maize"); without the diaeresis, the ⟨i⟩ is part of the digraph ⟨ai⟩: mais (IPA: [mɛ]; "but"). The letter is also used in the same context in Dutch, as in Oekraïne (pronounced [ukraːˈ(j)inə] and not *[uˈkrɑinə]; "Ukraine"), and English naïve (/nɑːˈiːv/ nah-EEV or /naɪˈiːv/ ny-EEV).

In scholarly writing on Turkic languages, ⟨ï⟩ is sometimes used to write the close back unrounded vowel /ɯ/, which, in the standard modern Turkish alphabet, is written as the dotless i ⟨ı⟩. The back neutral vowel reconstructed in Proto-Mongolic is sometimes written ⟨ï⟩.

In the transcription of Amazonian languages, ⟨ï⟩ is used to represent the high central vowel [ɨ].

It is also a transliteration of the rune ᛇ.

== Computing ==
The symbol is encoded in Unicode with these codepoints:

- U+00CF Ï LATIN CAPITAL LETTER I WITH DIAERESIS
- U+00EF ï LATIN SMALL LETTER I WITH DIAERESIS

== See also ==
- Umlaut (diacritic)
- Yi (Cyrillic) (Ї ї)
