= Î =

Latin letter I with circumflex

Latin letter I with circumflex

Î, î (i-circumflex) is a letter in the Dobrujan Tatar, Friulian, Kurdish, Tupi, Persian Rumi, and Romanian alphabets and phonetic Filipino. This letter also appears in French, Turkish, Italian, Welsh and Walloon as a variant of the letter “i”.

== Afrikaans ==
In Afrikaans, î is a punctuated form of i: wîe, the plural of wig ('wedge').

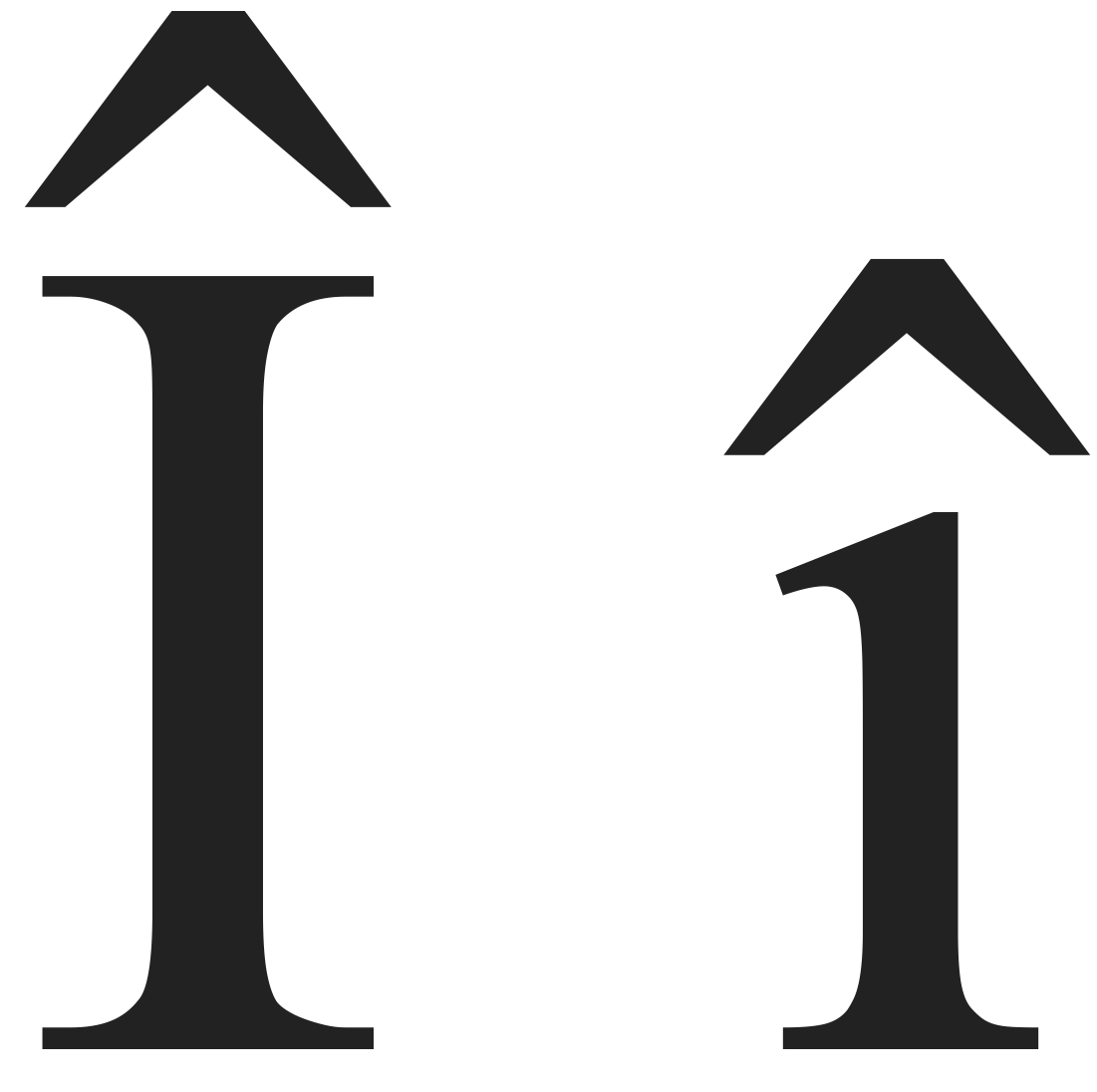
Doulos SIL glyphs for Majuscule and minuscule î.

== Dobrujan Tatar ==
Î is the 13th letter of the Dobrujan Tatar alphabet, this letter represents the hight unrounded RTR or hard vowel /ɯ/ as in îşan [ɯʃ̱ɑṉ] 'mouse'. At the end of the word it is pronounced with half open mouth shifting through dilatation "Keñiytúw" to mid unrounded RTR or hard /ɤ/, close to schwa, as in şîlapşî [ʃ̱ɯḻɑp̱ʃ̱ɤ] 'trough'.

== French ==
Î is a letter which appears in several French words, like Île (island), naître (to be born), abîme (abyss), maître (master), fraîche (fresh), and more. Unlike Â, Ê, and Ô, the circumflex does not alter the pronunciation of î or û.

The circumflex usually denotes the exclusion of a letter (usually an s) that was in a prior version of the word:

- voster became vôtre.
- abismus became abisme and then abîme.
- magister became maistre and then maître.

The 1990 spelling reforms removed the accents if they are not required to distinguish between homonyms and so naitre, abime, maitre and fraiche no longer take the circumflex. Vôtre, however, (meaning 'your one' as a pronoun) uses the circumflex to distinguish it from votre (meaning 'your' as a possessive determiner).

== Friulian ==
Î is used to get a longer value of I, becoming /iː/. It can be found for example in all verbs of the fourth conjugation: pandî /paɳ'diː/, (to revel). Another use of Î (and also the other long vowels), is due to Latin derivation. Instead of preserving the last vowel, in Friulian it was used to give a longer value to the penultimate vowel, ending the word with a consonant: gliru(m) < glîr, (dormouse), where the ending u disappeared.

== Italian ==
In Italian the circumflex accent is an optional accent. While the accent itself has many uses, with the letter ⟨i⟩ it is used only while forming the plural of male nouns ending in -io in order to minimize both ambiguity and the stressing of the wrong syllable: principio /prinˈtʃipjo/ (principle) has the plural principî /prinˈtʃipi/, and principe /ˈprintʃipe/ (prince) has principi /ˈprintʃipi/ as plural. In this situation it can be replaced with a double ⟨i⟩ (e.g. principii), with an ⟨i⟩ followed by a ⟨j⟩ (e.g. principij), with a single ⟨j⟩ (e.g. principj) or, more simply, with a single ⟨i⟩ (e.g. principi). In contemporary usage, the single ⟨i⟩ is mostly used and the other variants are seen as archaic and overly formal.

== Kurdish ==
Î is the 12th letter of the Kurdish alphabet and represents /iː/: Kurdî ([ˈkuɾdiː], 'Kurdish language').

== Persian ==
Î is used in the Persian Latin (Rumi) alphabet, equivalent to ي.

== Romanian ==
Î is the 12th letter of the Romanian alphabet and denotes /ɨ/. This sound is also represented in Romanian as letter â. The difference is that â is used in the middle of a word, as in România, but î is used at the beginning or the end of a word: înțelegere (understanding), a urî (to hate). A compound word starting with the letter î retains it, even if it is in the middle of the word: neînțelegere (misunderstanding). However, if a suffix is added, the î changes into â, as in the example: a urî (to hate), urât (hated).

== Turkish ==
In Turkish, î can indicate the /iː/ sound in Arabic loanwords where it is used as an adjectival suffix that makes an adjective from a noun: askerî (military), millî (national), dâhilî (internal) etc.

== Welsh ==
In Welsh, î is used to represent long stressed i [iː] when, without the circumflex, the vowel would be pronounced as short [ɪ] (dîm [diːm], the mutated form of "team"), as opposed to dim [dɪm] "no, nought, nothing".

== Other usage ==
=== In mathematics ===
- The letter $\mathbf{\hat{\boldsymbol{\imath}}}$ is sometimes used to denote a unit vector in physics.

== Character mappings ==
Character information
Preview	Î		î	
Unicode name	LATIN CAPITAL LETTER I WITH CIRCUMFLEX		LATIN SMALL LETTER I WITH CIRCUMFLEX	
Encodings	decimal	hex	dec	hex
Unicode	206	U+00CE	238	U+00EE
UTF-8	195 142	C3 8E	195 174	C3 AE
Numeric character reference	&#206;	&#xCE;	&#238;	&#xEE;
Named character reference	&Icirc;		&icirc;	

== See also ==
- Circumflex
- tab key (^+I on some systems)
