= È =

Latin letter E with grave accent

E with grave
- È è

Usage
- Writing system: Latin script
- Language of origin: French
- Sound values: [ɛ]
- In Unicode: U+00C8, U+00E8

È (minuscule: è), known as E-grave, is a Latin-script character composed of the letter E and a grave accent. In English, it is sometimes used in the past tense or past participle forms of verbs in poetic texts to indicate that the final syllable should be pronounced separately. For example, blessèd would indicate the pronunciation /ˈblɛsɪd/ BLESS-id, as opposed to /blɛst/ BLEST for the word blessed. It also occurs in loanwords such as Italian caffè.

== In other languages ==
- In Emilian, è is used to represent [ɛː], e.g. lèt [lɛːt] "bed".
- In French, it always represents a [ɛ] sound of letter e when this is at the end of a syllable.
- È (è) is used in Indonesian dictionaries to represent /ɛ/ which differs from plain e (/ə/) and é (/e/). The same applies to Javanese and Sundanese.
- È means "is" in modern Italian [ɛ], e.g. il cane è piccolo meaning "the dog is small". It is derived from Latin ĕst and is accented to distinguish it from the conjunction e meaning "and". È is also used to mark a stressed [ɛ] at the end of a word only, as in caffè.
- È (è) is used in Limburgish for the [ɛ] sound, like in the word 'Sjtèl'.
- È in Norwegian (both Bokmål and Nynorsk) is used in some words to denote a longer vowel such as in karrière (career).
- È (è) is also used in Macedonian Latin as an equivalent of the letter ye with grave (Ѐ, ѐ).
- In Romagnol, it represents [ɛ], e.g. vècc' [vɛtʃː] "old men".
- È (è) is used to mark the long vowel sounds [ɛː] and [eː] in Scottish Gaelic.
- È (è) is used in Vietnamese to represent the letter "E" with the dấu huyền tone. It can also combine with "Ê" to form "Ề".
- È (è) is also used for an [ɤ] with a falling tone in pinyin, a Standard Chinese romanization system. The word 鄂, consisting only of this vowel, is an abbreviation for the Hubei province, China.

== Unicode ==
Character information
Preview	È		è	
Unicode name	LATIN CAPITAL LETTER E WITH GRAVE		LATIN SMALL LETTER E WITH GRAVE	
Encodings	decimal	hex	dec	hex
Unicode	200	U+00C8	232	U+00E8
UTF-8	195 136	C3 88	195 168	C3 A8
Numeric character reference	&#200;	&#xC8;	&#232;	&#xE8;
Named character reference	&Egrave;		&egrave;	

== See also ==
- Ye with grave, a Cyrillic letter with a similar glyph.
