= Ì =

Latin letter I with grave accent

I with grave
- Ì ì

Usage
- Writing system: Latin alphabet
- Type: alphabet
- In Unicode: U+00CC, U+00EC

Ì (minuscule: ì), known as I-grave, is a Latin-script character composed of the Letter I and a grave accent.

== Usage ==
It is used in the ISO 9:1995 system of Belarusian and Ukrainian transliteration as the Cyrillic letter І.

In the Pinyin system of Chinese romanization, ì is an i with a falling tone.

This appears in Alcozauca Mixtec, Italian, Sardinian, Lithuanian, Alsatian, Welsh, Ojibwe, Vietnamese, Scottish Gaelic and in the constructed language Na'vi to represent a close front unrounded vowel.

== Unicode ==
- U+00CC Ì LATIN CAPITAL LETTER I WITH GRAVE
- U+00EC ì LATIN SMALL LETTER I WITH GRAVE
