= TRS-80 (disambiguation) =

TRS-80 is the name of Tandy Corporation's original 1977 microcomputer system (also known as the Model I). The TRS-80 brand was also later applied to many different computers sold by Tandy, including several unrelated in design to the Model I.

== Computers ==
- TRS-80 Model I (1977), the original TRS-80 Micro Computer System
  - TRS-80 Model III (1980), improved and compatible replacement for the Model I
  - TRS-80 Model 4 (including Model 4P), successor to the Model III
- TRS-80 Model II (1979), small-business oriented microcomputer, not related to the original Model I
  - TRS-80 Model 12 (1982), successor to the Model II
  - TRS-80 Model 16, (including Model 16B), successor to the Model 12
- TRS-80 Color Computer ("CoCo") (1980), a Motorola 6809-based line of computers
- TRS-80 MC-10 (1983), a short-lived, low-end hobbyist-oriented computer
- TRS-80 Model 100 (1983), an early portable computer
- TRS-80 Pocket Computer, a series of rebadged pocket computers manufactured by Sharp and Casio for Tandy
  - TRS-80 Pocket Computer PC-1, the original model in the lane (a rebadged Sharp PC-1211)
  - TRS-80 Pocket Computer PC-2, a rebadged Sharp PC-1500
  - TRS-80 Pocket Computer PC-3, a rebadged Sharp PC-1251

== Other ==
- TRS-80 (group), an electronic music group formed in Chicago in 1997

== See also ==
- Video Genie, a line of TRS-80 Model I clones sold as the TRZ-80 in South Africa
- List of TRS-80 clones
