= Sharp PC-1251 =

Pocket computer

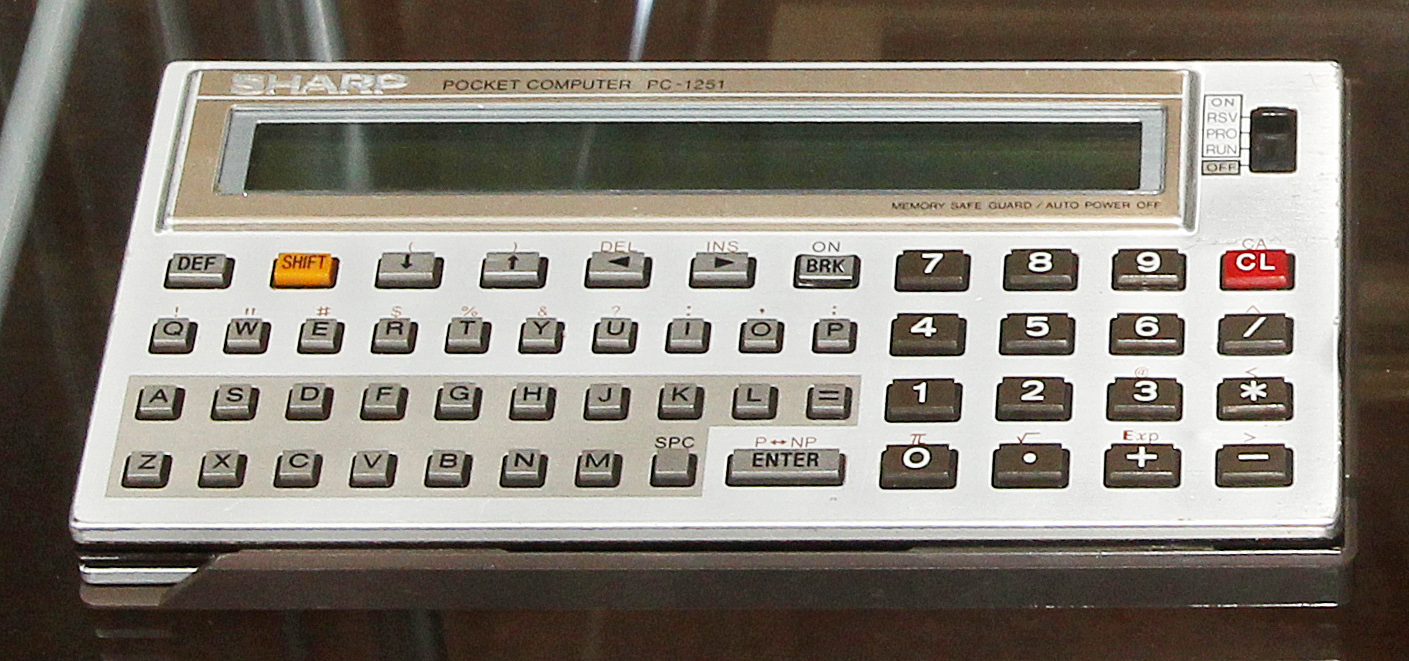
- Sharp PC-1251
- Manufacturer: Sharp Corporation
- Generation: First
- Released: 1982
- Memory: 4 Kbit RAM modules, 24kB ROM
- Display: 24 digit dot matrix LCD
- Input: Full QWERTY-style keyboard, 52 keys
- Power: 2 built-in batteries
- Successor: Sharp PC-5000
- Related: Sharp PC-1211; Sharp PC-1500

The Sharp PC-1251 was a small pocket computer that was also marketed as the Tandy or TRS-80 Pocket Computer PC-3.

It was created by Sharp Corporation in 1982.

== Technical specifications ==
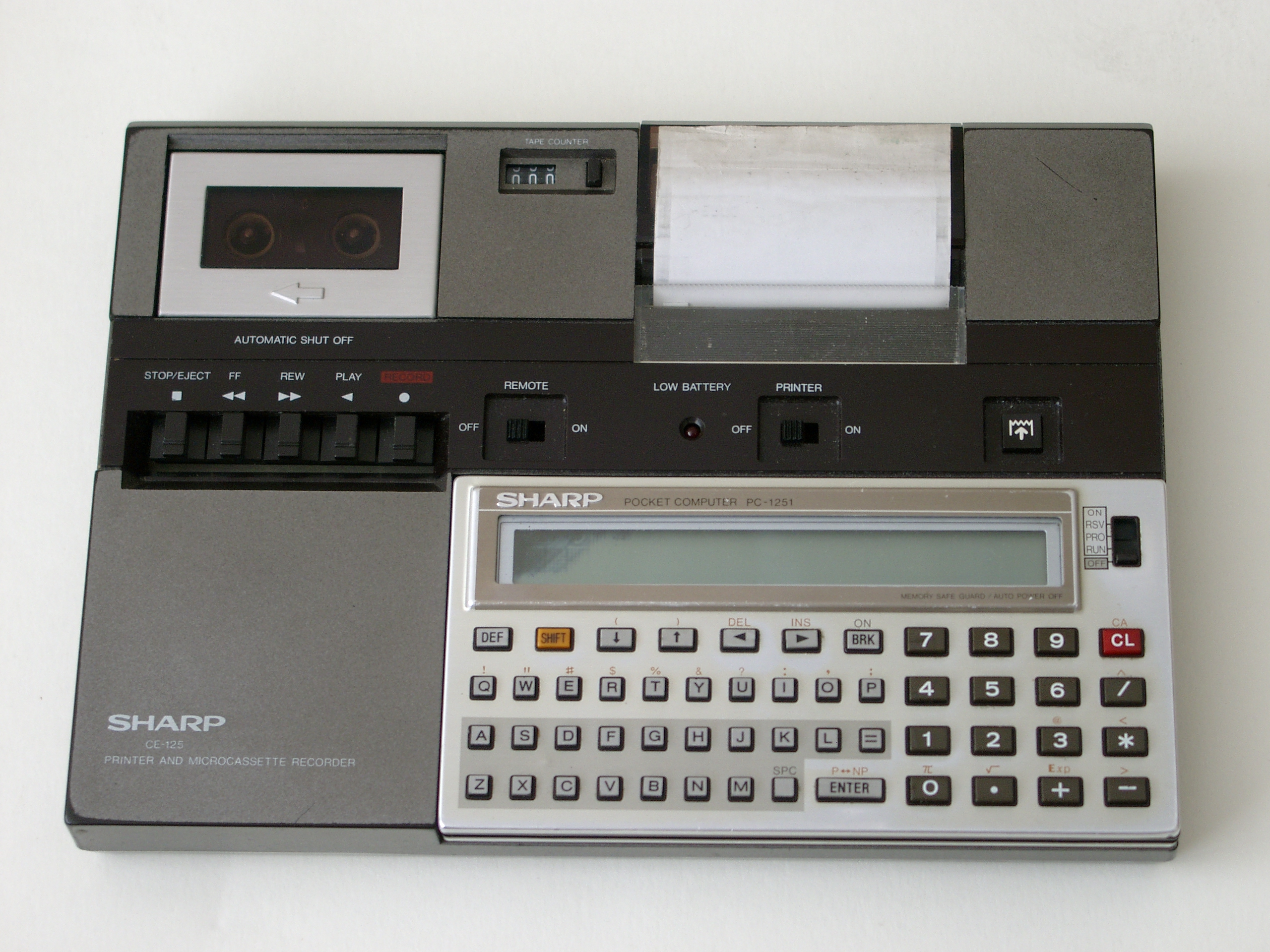
PC-1251, with its printer and microcassette recorder

- CPU: SC61860 (8-bit CMOS), 576 kHz clock frequency
- 24 digit (5×7 pixel) LCD
- Integrated speaker
- Same connector for printer and tape drive as PC-1401
- 2 built-in batteries
- 4 KB RAM
- 24 KB ROM

== See also ==
- Sharp pocket computer character sets
