= Sharp PC-1600 =

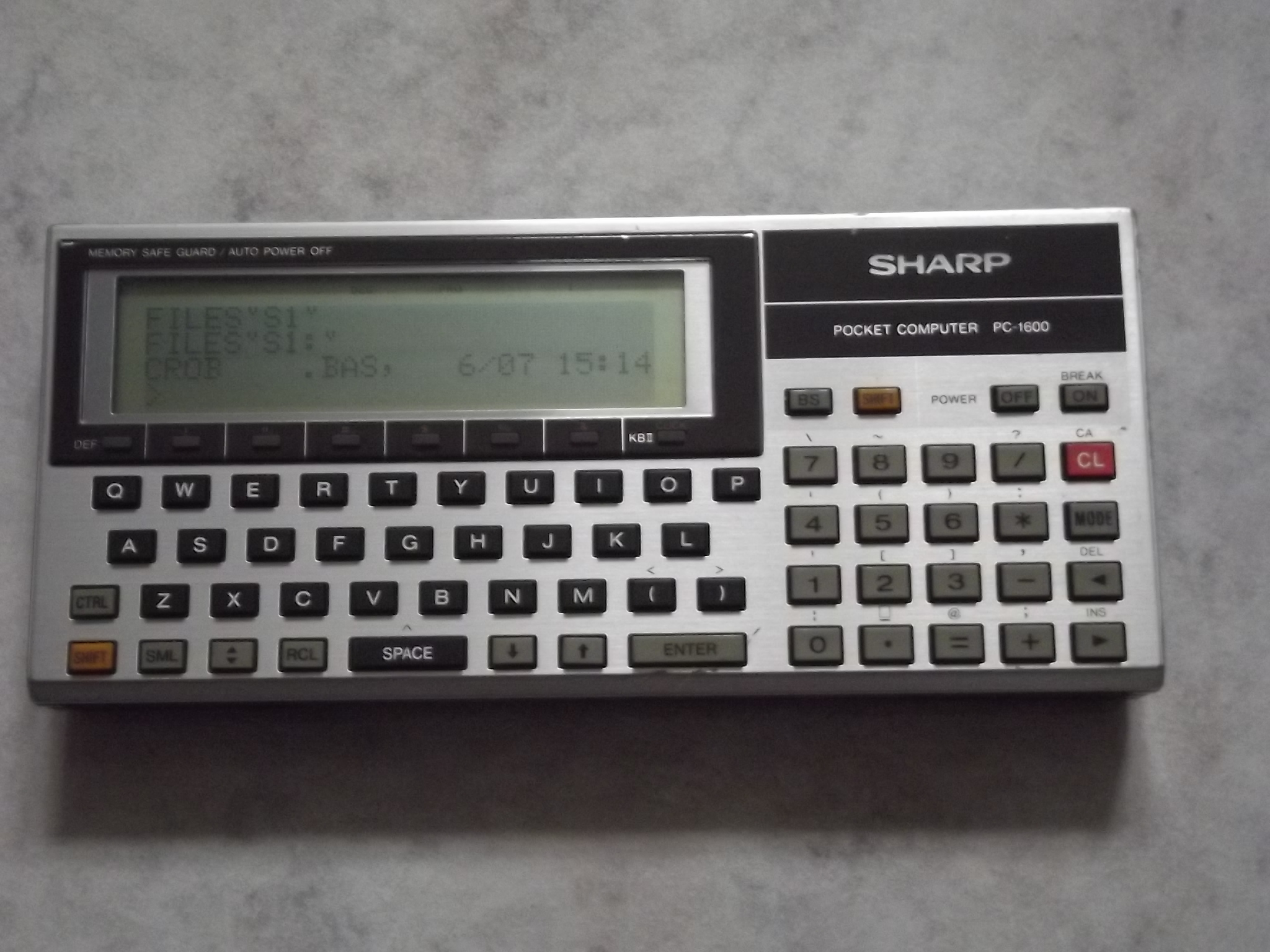
- Type: pocket computer
- Manufacturer: Sharp

Calculator
- Entry mode: BASIC

Programming
- User memory: 16K
- Firmware memory: 96K

The Sharp PC-1600 was a pocket computer introduced by Sharp in 1986 as a successor to the PC-1500. The PC-1600 provided compatibility with its predecessor through the use of a slave CPU that could run assembly language programs targeting the older machine. It could also switch into a compatibility mode so that programs written for the single line display of the PC-1500 could work with the four line display of the PC-1600.

PC-1500 peripherals such as the CE-150 cassette interface were also supported.

== Technical specifications ==
- SC-7852 CMOS 8 bit microprocessor, equivalent to the Z-80A, 3.58 MHz
- LH-5803 slave CPU compatible with PC-1500, 1.3 MHz
- LU-57813P sub CPU, 307.2 kHz
- 96K ROM
- 16K RAM, expandable to 80K
- 26 column, 4 line LCD with a 5x7 character matrix
- 156x32 dot graphics
- Real time clock
- RS-232C interface
- Optical serial port
- Analogue interface for connection to sensors
- 390 g in weight with batteries

=== Accessories ===
- CE-1600M program module providing 32K of battery backed storage
- CE-1600P Printer/Cassette interface
- CE-1600F 2.5-inch double-sided pocket disk drive providing 64K of storage per side with CE-1650F media

== See also ==
- Sharp pocket computer character sets
