= Sharp PC-1403 =

Microcomputer brand

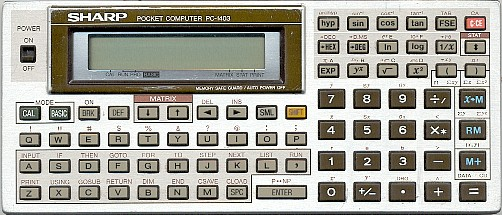
- Sharp PC-1403 handheld BASIC computer
- Type: Pocket computer
- Introduced: 1986

Calculator
- Entry mode: Infix, BASIC,
- Display type: LCD dot-matrix
- Display size: 24 characters

CPU
- Processor: CPU: SC61860 (8-bit CMOS)
- Frequency: 768 kHz

Programming
- Programming language(s): Unstructured BASIC
- User memory: 8 KB
- Firmware memory: 72 KB

Interfaces
- Ports: 1x proprietary (11 pins)

Other
- Power supply: 2x CR2032
- Power consumption: 0.03 W

The Sharp PC-1403 was a small scientific calculator and pocket computer manufactured by Sharp. It was the successor of the Sharp PC-1401, and had better display, more RAM and better system software.

== Technical specifications ==
- CPU: SC61860 (8-bit CMOS) 768 kHz
- Memory: 8 KB RAM (6863 bytes available), 72 KB ROM; 32 KB RAM in PC-1403H model
- Display: Monochrome LCD 1 line with 24 5×7 characters
- Power: 6 V DC - 2× CR2032, 0.03 W
- Connector (11 pins) for external devices
- Integrated speaker (4 kHz beep only)
- Contrast adjustment wheel
- Software: Simple BASIC interpreter; calculator mode
- Matrix calculations

Manufacturing started in 1986.

It is possible to convert the 1403 to a 1403H by removing the 8 K RAM and soldering in a 32 K RAM. An inverter IC is needed for this, too.

== Calculator ==
Calculations could be performed in two modes CAL and RUN. In the former, the PC-1403 would behave like a normal scientific calculator at the time with formulas entered in algebraic logic. In RUN mode, BASIC statements could be entered for immediate execution and print out. The latter was similar to the Direct algebraic logic employed by modern calculators.

== Programming ==
The programming model employed was unstructured BASIC for which the PC-1403 distinguished between RUN and PRO mode. The latter being used to enter and edit program and the former being used to execute them.

=== Programming example ===
Here is a sample program that computes the factorial of an integer number from 0 to 69. It can be called by entering a number or an expression followed by pressing DEF F (in run mode).

10 "F" AREAD N                         ''allows to start the program with <expression> DEF F
20 F=1                                 ''Set start value of F to 1
30 FOR I=1 TO N                        ''counts I from 1 to N
40 F=F*I                               ''calculates F=F*I
50 NEXT I                              ''repeats loop from line 40
60 PRINT STR$ N+"!=";F                 ''print result - i.e. 5!=120.
70 END                                 ''end of program

=== Machine language programming ===
It is possible to write machine language programs into memory using the POKE command and starting them with the CALL command.

== See also ==
- Sharp pocket computer character sets
