= Sharp PC-E220 =

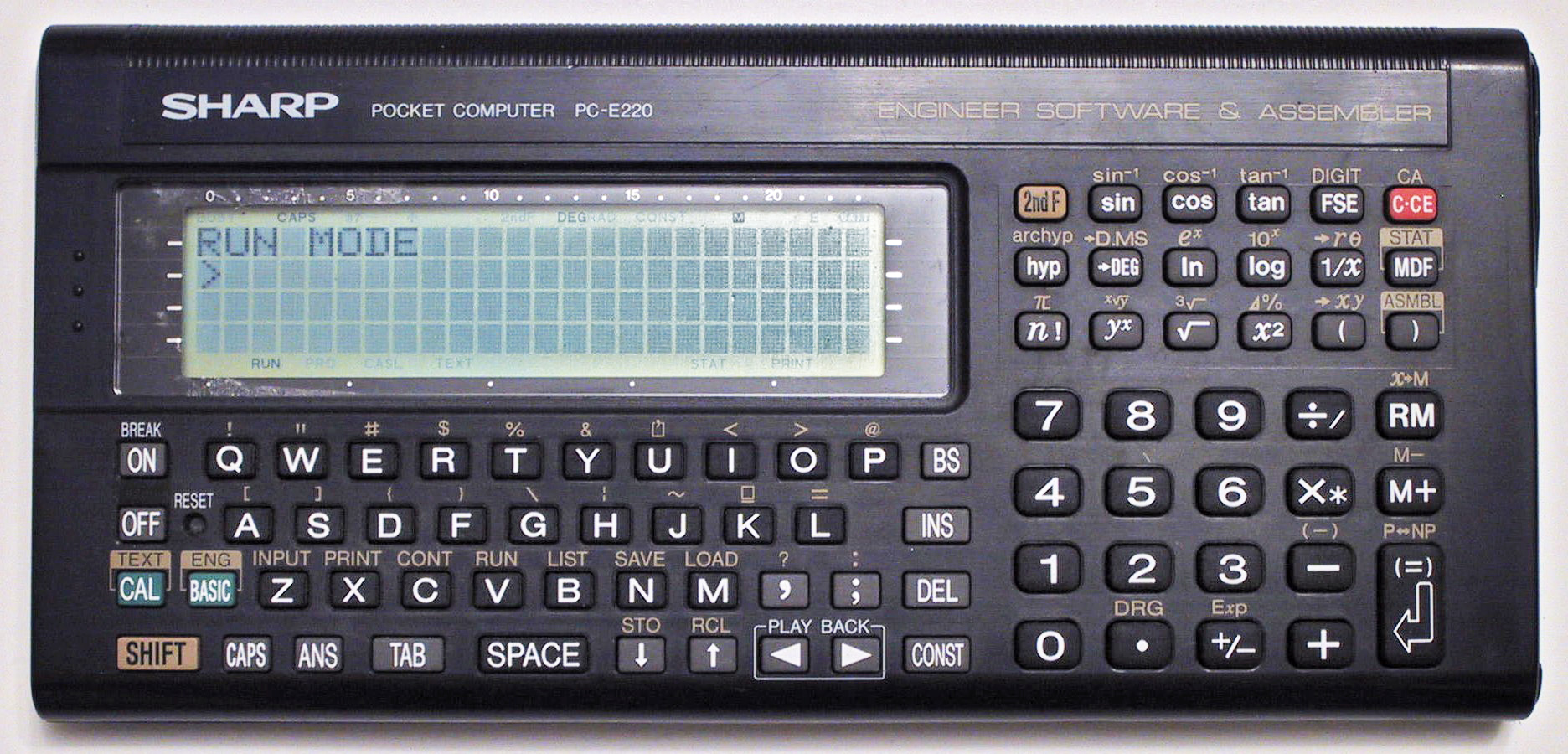
- Type: pocket computer
- Manufacturer: Sharp Corporation

Programming
- User memory: 32K
- Firmware memory: 128K

The Sharp PC-E220 was a 1991 pocket computer from Sharp Corporation featuring 32 KB RAM, 128 KB ROM and a 3.072 MHz CMOS-SC7852 CPU which was Z80A compatible. The display was able to display 4 lines x 24 characters/144 x 32 pixels. Programming languages were BASIC and Z80-Assembler.

The computer was powered by four consecutively ordered AA batteries which makes this computer the biggest of the Sharp pocket computer range, whereas the CPU made it the fastest. The BASIC interpreter is mostly compatible with the interpreter of the PC-14xx series.

== See also ==
- Sharp pocket computer character sets
