= Sharp PC-1401 =

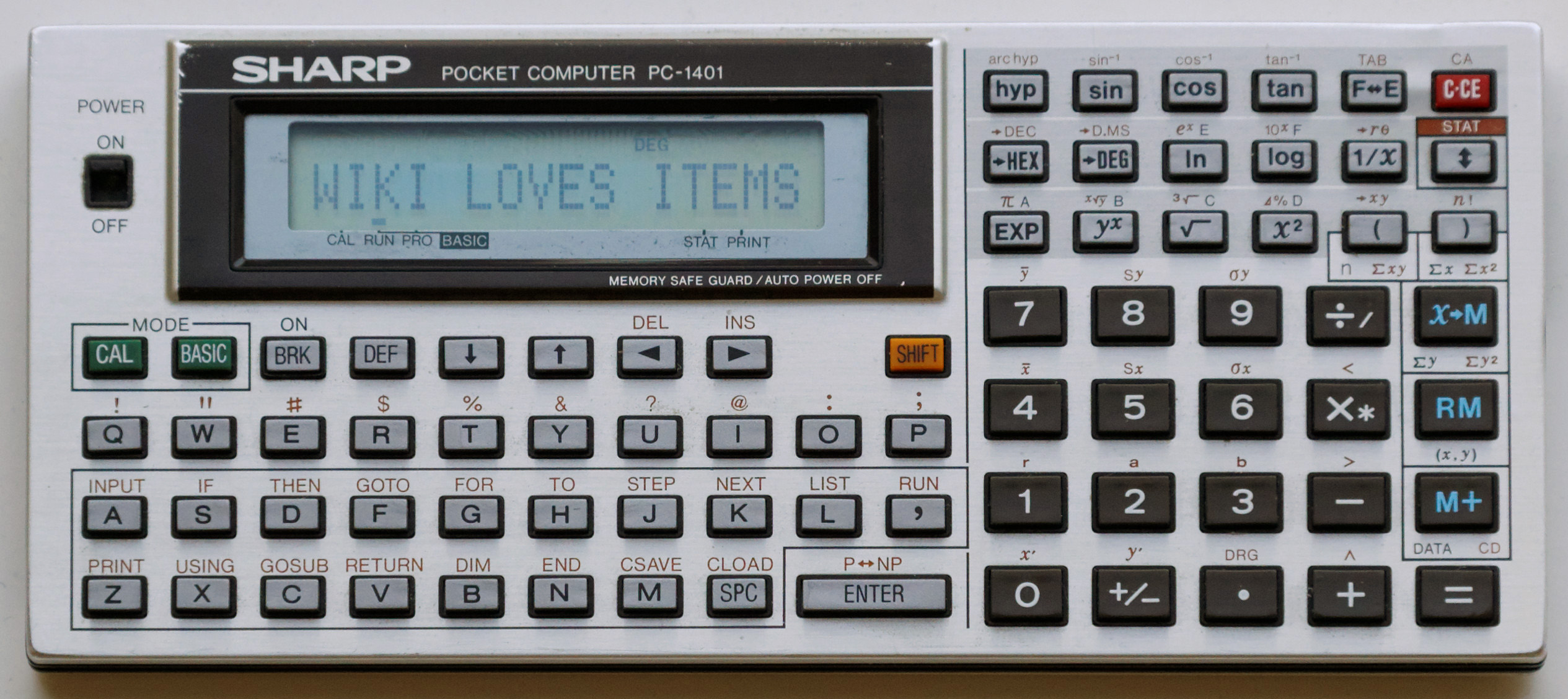
Sharp Pocket Computer PC-1401

The Sharp PC-1401 is a small pocket computer manufactured by Sharp. It was introduced in 1983 and is one of the first combinations of scientific calculator and portable computer with BASIC interpreter/bytecode compiler. The PC-1402 has the same features but includes 10K of RAM.

== Technical specifications ==
- CPU: SC61860 (8-bit CMOS), 576 kHz clock frequency
- 4 KiB RAM (3534 bytes usable) (Two 2К×8 CMOS Static RAM HM6116 chips)
- 40 KiB ROM (SC613256 chip)
- Display: monochrome LCD 16 digits (5×7 pixel) in 1 line (Controlled by SC43536 chip)
- Integrated piezoelectric speaker
- Keyboard: 76 keys, 1 switch on front, 1 key, 1 knob on back/side
- 11-pin serial connector for printer/cassette controller CE-126P
- Powered from two CR2032 batteries, power consumption is less than 0.03 W
- Size: 170×72×9.5mm, weighing around 150 grams

== Peripherals ==
The machine has an 11-pin serial connector, which is almost through-hole compatible. This connects to a proprietary thermal printer, such as a CE-126P. The printer will also serve as an adapter to connect to a tape recorder. The tape recorder provides program and data backup.

== Variants ==
=== PC-1421 ===
The PC-1421 is a variant of the PC-1401 for financial calculations. It differs from the PC-1401 in the contents of its ROM and higher CPU speed. The PC-1421 CPU clocks at 768kHz vs 576kHz for the PC-1401.

=== PC-1430 ===
The PC-1430 is a stripped-down variant of the PC-1401. The display and case are mostly the same (except for fewer keys), but the PC-1430 lacks the calculator modus (for calculations the BASIC mode has to be used), it offers less functions, only 2 KB RAM, and no speaker or buzzer.

=== PC-1450 ===
The PC-1450 supports user changeable RAM cards: CE-211M (3070 bytes = 4 KB / Standard), CE-201M (7166 bytes = 8 KB) or CE-202M (15,358 bytes = 16 KB).

== Program examples ==
10 "F"                                 ''allows to start the program with DEF F
20 INPUT "N=?";N                       ''Ask for n
30 LET F=1                             ''Set start value of F to 1
40 FOR I=1 TO N STEP 1                 ''counts I from 1 to N
50 LET F=F*I                           ''calculates F=F*I
60 NEXT I                              ''repeats loop from line 40
70 PRINT USING "##";N;"!="; USING ;F   ''print result - i.E. 5!=120
80 END                                 ''end of program

== See also ==
- Sharp PC-1403
- Sharp pocket computer character sets
