= Sharp PC-1500 =

Pocket computer

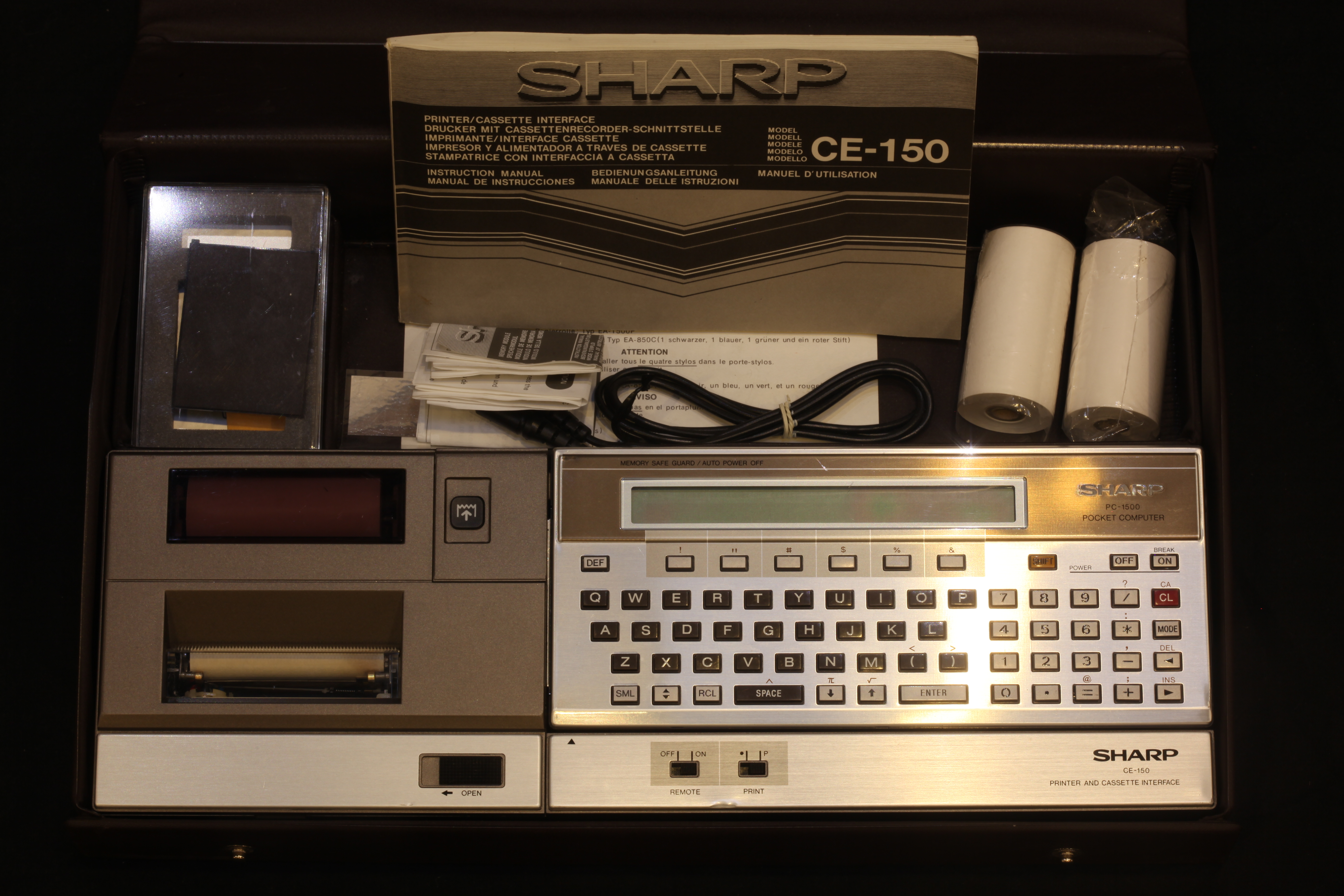
- The Sharp PC-1500 with printer/plotter and cassette interface in travel case. On display at the Musée Bolo, EPFL, Lausanne.
- Generation: First
- Released: 1981; 45 years ago
- Lifespan: 1981-1985 (4 years)
- Discontinued: 1985; 41 years ago
- CPU: LH5801 (8-bit CMOS MPU) @ 1.3 MHz
- Memory: 3.5 KB
- Display: 7x156 dot LCD
- Successor: Sharp PC-5000
- Related: Sharp PC-1211; Sharp PC-1251

The Sharp PC-1500 was a pocket computer produced by Sharp between 1981 and 1985. A rebadged version was also sold as the TRS-80 Pocket Computer PC-2.

The whole computer was designed around the LH5801, an 8-bit CPU similar to the Zilog Z80, but all laid-out in power-saving CMOS circuits. Equipped with 3.5 KB of on-board RAM (2.6 KB in the user area), the programming language is BASIC. Later, German engineers provided an assembler for the machine. Later even a C compiler followed. An external slot is available and accepts memory (from 4 KB to 32 KB) and ROM modules.

Eight versions of this pocket computer with 2 KB memory:

- Sharp PC-1500 - Japanese version (1981)
- Sharp PC-1500 - Japanese version with blue paint around LCD. CE-157 Kana module bundle model. Known as PC-1500D (1984)
- Sharp PC-1500 - European, Australasian and North American version (1982)
- Sharp PC-1500 RP2 - Brazilian version (1982)
- HiradasTechnika PTA-4000 - Hungarian licence.
- HiradasTechnika PTA-4000+16 - Hungarian licence (with internal 16 KB memory extension)
- Tandy TRS-80 PC-2
- Nanfeng PC-1500A - Chinese license (CKD assembly from Japanese components)

Two versions with 8 KB memory:

- Sharp PC-1501 - Japanese rework with 8 KB memory (1984)
- Sharp PC-1500A - Western rework with 8 KB memory (1984)

== Technical specifications ==
- 156×7 pixel LCD
- Integrated speaker
- Integrated RTC
- Memory/cartridge slot
- 60-pin expansion port for printer and tape drive
- Battery slot (4×AA)
- Connector for external power supply (Official adaptor is Sharp EA-150, rated at 500 mA at 9 V, comes with the CE-150 printer interface.)

=== Accessories ===
- CE-150 4-colour printer/plotter and cassette interface in travel case. Known as KA-160 with PTA-4000.
- CE-151 4 KB memory module
- CE-152 Cassette recorder (as external storage) (same as General Electric 3-5160A)
- CE-153 Software board
- CE-154 Wallet dedicated to PC-1500 + CE-150 + CE-152 + CE-153
- CE-155 8 KB memory module
- CE-156 Tape with Katakana software
- CE-157 4 KB memory module with CR2032 battery data backup and Katakana chars ROM
- CE-158 Communication dock with RS-232C and parallel interface with (4 rechargeable, shrink-wrapped, permanently built-in) NiCd battery (AA) as additional power supply for the computer.
- CE-159 8 KB memory module with CR2032 battery data backup
- CE-160 7.6 KB read only memory module with CR2032 battery data backup
- CE-161 16 KB memory module with CR2032 battery data backup
- CE-162E Tape and parallel port interface
- CE-163 32 KB (2x16 KB) dual-page memory module with CR2032 battery data backup. Only one page (16 KB) can be accessed at a time, switchable via the following command in PROG mode:

                    Page 0 : POKE&5804,0 [enter]
                    Page 1 : POKE&5804,1 [enter]

== Related Sharp pocket computers ==
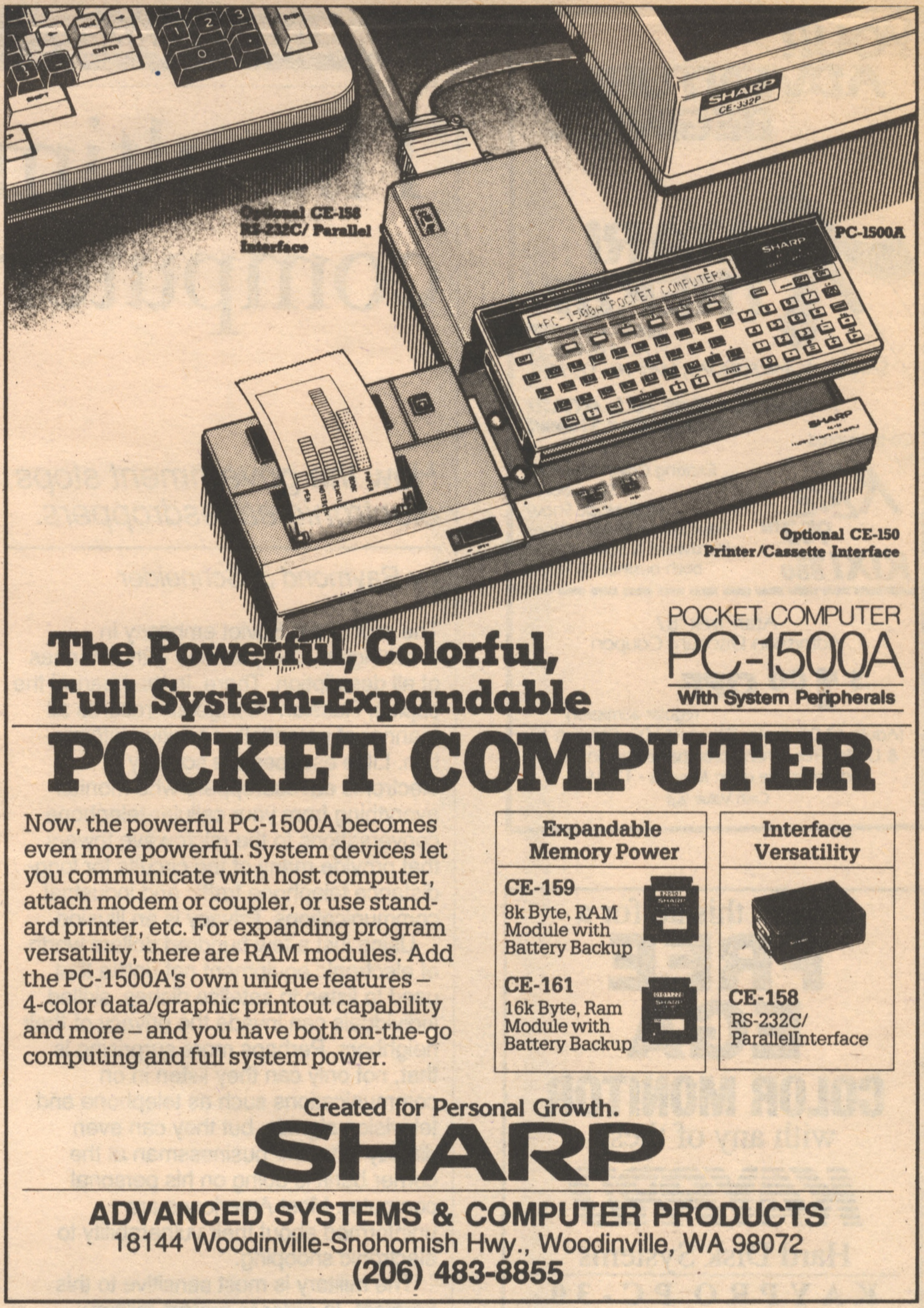
An advertisement for the Sharp PC-1500A from the Puget Sound ComputerUser.

- Sharp PC-1210
- Sharp PC-1211
- Sharp PC-1251
- Sharp PC-1500
- Sharp PC-1500A upgrade version with 8 KB onboard RAM
- Sharp PC-1501 Japanese version of PC-1500A
- Sharp PC-1600 with more memory and larger multi-line LCD and more graphics capabilities

== BASIC compatibility with early models ==
Some earlier model PC-1500s will show a value 1 less in the FOR...NEXT counter on exiting the loop compared to later PC-1500s and the PC-1600.

For example:

10 FOR K=1 TO 10
20 NEXT K
30 PRINT K

K will be set to 11 on later model PC-1500s and PC-1600s, but will be 10 on early PC-1500s.

Consider this example:

10 S=0
20 FOR K=1 TO 10 STEP 4
30 S=S+1
40 NEXT K
50 PRINT S

S will be set to 3 on later model PC-1500s and PC-1600s, but will be 4 on early PC-1500s.

Early model PC-1500s evaluate IF...THEN statements differently. The behaviour can be summarised thus:

Model	True	False
PC-1600 / Later PC-1500	≠0	0
Early PC-1500	>0	<0

An early model PC-1500 can be detected by using the command: PEEK&C5C0.

If the value returned is 6, it is an early model.

== Example program in BASIC ==
  1 ARUN 10
  5 REM   "PC1500 VAT Program:"
 10 INPUT "Price: ";P
 20 PRINT P;"  ";P*V;"  ";P*V*M   
 30 GOTO 10
 40 END

The PC-1500 allows special abbreviations, and the syntax can also look as follows:

 20 PRINT P;"  ";PV;"  ";PVM

=== Usage of variables ===
P = Purchase Price
V = VAT (%/100)     - To be input by hand before calculation begins, e.g.: V=1.14 (Enter)
M = Markup (%/100)  - To be input by hand before calculation begins, e.g.: M=1.15 (Enter)

=== Display of the answers are as follows ===
 Answer1;            Answer2;         Answer3
 Purchase Price;     VAT Price;       Sales Price
 Value: P;           Value: P*V;      Value: P*V*M

=== Program description ===
Line 1	The ARUN command executes every time the computer is switched on and jumps to line 10.
Line 5	This is the REMARK statement (used to include remarks into the source code).
Line 10	The INPUT command asks for input from the user and stores the values in the variable "P".
Line 20	The PRINT command shows the calculated result as follows: 100 114 142.5. The abbreviated form is special to the PC-1500, as it can only make use of single letter variables and matrixes. This also saves valuable storage space!
Line 30	The GOTO command lets the program jump back to line 10, to continue the program over
Line 40	The END statement is to be placed on the last line of the code to terminate execution, however in this case it can be omitted, as it is not really necessary.

== Significance ==
The design of initial prototypes of EMKE series of public transport cash registers were built around customized versions of the PC-1500 and its Hungarian clone PTA-4000. The series production models used almost exclusively in Hungarian regional and national bus services up to present day, are built around a version designed by EMKE and are heavily influenced by the PC-1500 design.

== Emulation ==
With the SHARP PC-1500A emulator and the PockEmul you can emulate a PC-1500A.

== See also ==
- Sharp pocket computer character sets
