= Sharp Wizard =

Personal organizer released in 1988

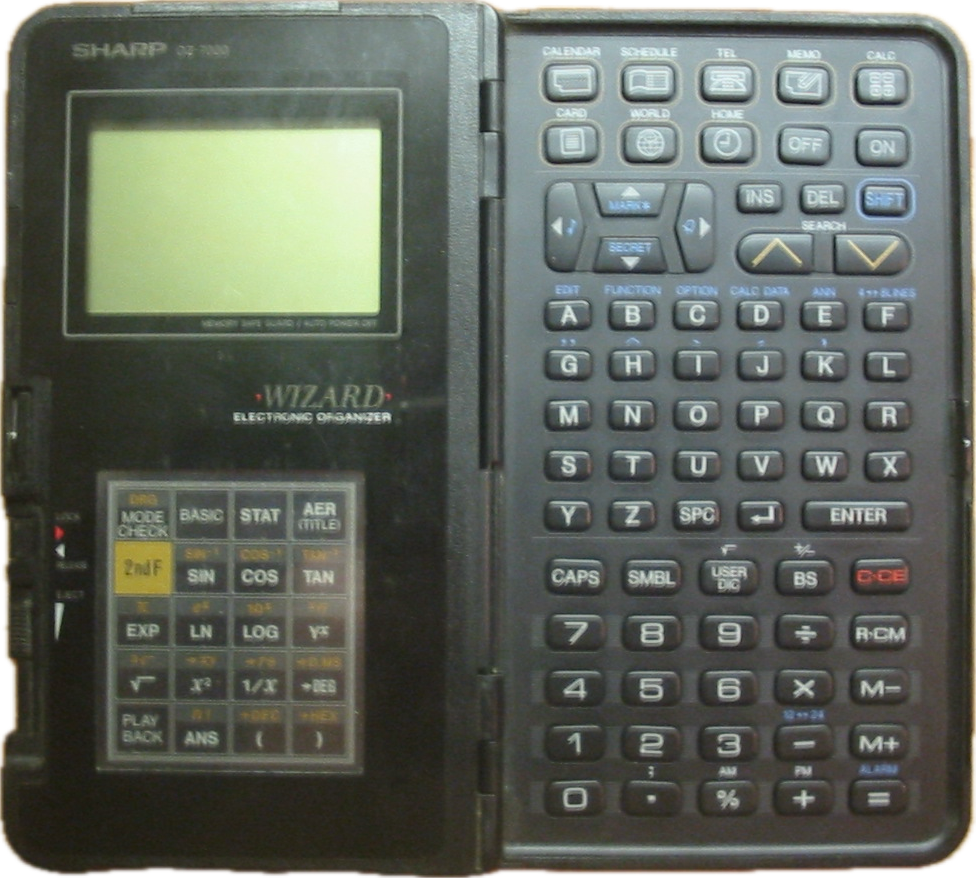
- The original OZ-7000 with a scientific calculator expansion IC Card installed
- Developer: Sharp Corporation
- Released: 1989
- Connectivity: Serial port IC Card slot

The Sharp Wizard series, introduced by the Sharp Corporation in 1989, was among the first electronic organizers and a precursor to personal digital assistants (PDAs). The debut model, the OZ-7000 (known as the IQ-7000 in Europe), combined organizer functions with an IC Card expansion system, allowing users to install software and memory cards. Over time, Sharp refined the series with larger displays, increased memory, and enhanced features, such as infrared communications port for wireless data transfer, touch-sensitive displays, and clamshell designs.

== Specifications and history ==
The OZ-7000 was about 6.3 inches (163 mm) tall, 3.7 inches (94 mm) wide closed, 7.25 inches (184 mm) open, and 0.85 inches (21.5 mm) thick closed, making it much larger than later PDAs. It featured a serial port (proprietary connector) to attach to a Windows PC or Macintosh or another OZ-7xxx/OZ-8xxx device, an optional thermal printer port and a cassette tape backup. The OZ-7000/IQ-7000 model featured 32 kilobytes of internal memory and a 96 x 64 dot (8 lines x 16 characters or 4 lines x 12 characters) black and white LCD with controllable contrast but without a back light. A major advertised feature of the model was the IC Cards expansion slot for accessory cards developed by Sharp.

The expansion cards (IC Cards) were about the same size and shape of PC Cards but predated this standard and were incompatible with the latter. The IC Cards were inserted in a slot behind a transparent plastic panel with an overlay touch-sensitive sensor organized in a 4x5 array of touch zones, thus allowing up to 20 "buttons" to be used for control of IC Cards functions. The selection of IC cards included memory expansion cards, a thesaurus dictionary, a Time and Expense Manager, an Investment Planner, a bilingual and 8-Language translators, an "Encyclopaedia of Wine" and even games like "Box Jockey" (a Sokoban clone), Tetris, chess and backgammon. A spreadsheet software card capable of handling 26 columns by 999 rows tables compatible with Lotus 1-2-3 was available too.

The out-of-the-box functionality of the OZ-7000/IQ-7000 included a memo pad, a telephone pad, calendar and scheduling with alarms and repeating events, multi-time zone clocks, and a calculator, thus covering all the basic functions found in PDAs since. The keyboard was not QWERTY, although later models, starting with OZ/IQ-8000, changed the orientation of the screen and keyboard layout.

In 1991 Sharp released an enhanced version of IQ-7000 — the IQ-7200 with internal memory increased up to 64K.

The OZ-8000 followed later in 1991, with a larger (240 x 64 dot) screen and 64K of internal, non-volatile memory. The OZ-8200 was launched at the same time with 128K of internal non-volatile memory. Both models shared the same form factor. A custom fitted leather, padded carrying case was also available for both models. The devices opened in landscape rather than portrait orientation with the IC Cards slot position changed accordingly. The dimensions of the OZ-8000 and OZ-8200 were similar to the OZ-7000 at 162mm x 94mm x 21.5mm.

The OZ-9600 and OZ-9600II were the last in this family of PDA in the Wizard line. These were larger at 180mm W x 105mm D x 25.4mm H (7-3/32" x 4-1/8" x 1"). The OZ-9600II weighed 430g (0.95 lb) including batteries.

Later Wizard organizers were smaller, dispensing with the expansion slot and soon bore little resemblance to the original OZ-7000.

In 1991 Sharp released also a series of IC cards allowing programming in BASIC for the OZ-7000, thus turning the organizer to more a PDA-like device. The same version of BASIC had been used in later Sharp PDAs, both Wizards and pocket computers such as the Sharp PC-E500S. The line of devices utilizing touch-controlled IC cards had been concluded with the IQ-8500 model.

Starting with the OZ-8900 and, later, the OZ-9xxx series, Sharp moved to production of clam-shell design/touch-sensitive display devices. Newer Wizards had an integrated IR transmitter allowing data exchange with PCs or other OZ-9xxx devices. The innovative design had the main features of the initial Zaurus line which continued this PDA family for Sharp. Due to new features, IC Cards for these devices were not backwards compatible with the OZ-7xxx series.

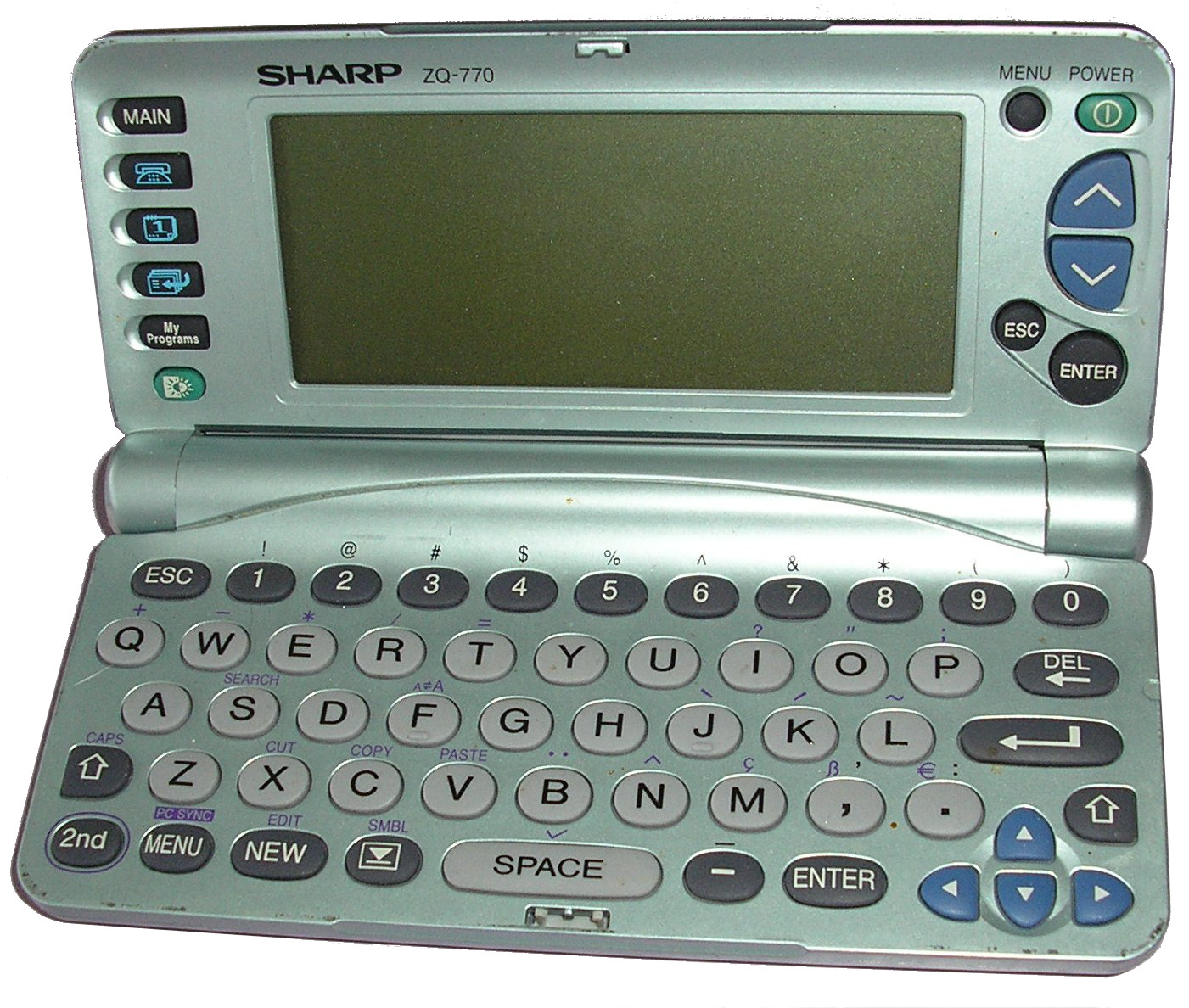
Opened Sharp Electronic Organizer (sold as Sharp Wizard in the US) model ZQ-770.

The later Sharp Wizards were something between an electronic databank and a PDA. They were small, lightweight devices with keyboards but no touch screen, running on a Zilog Z80.

Starting with the ZQ-770, model numbers had the prefixes either of OZ (for the USA market, where the prefix from the beginning was meant to be a pun on The Wizard of Oz) or ZQ (rest of the world) followed by a number, for instance ZQ-770, a non-US organizer with 3 MB memory, thus abandoning the IQ prefix used earlier.

== See also ==
- "The Wizard" (Seinfeld)
