= Sharp PC-1211 =

Pocket computer

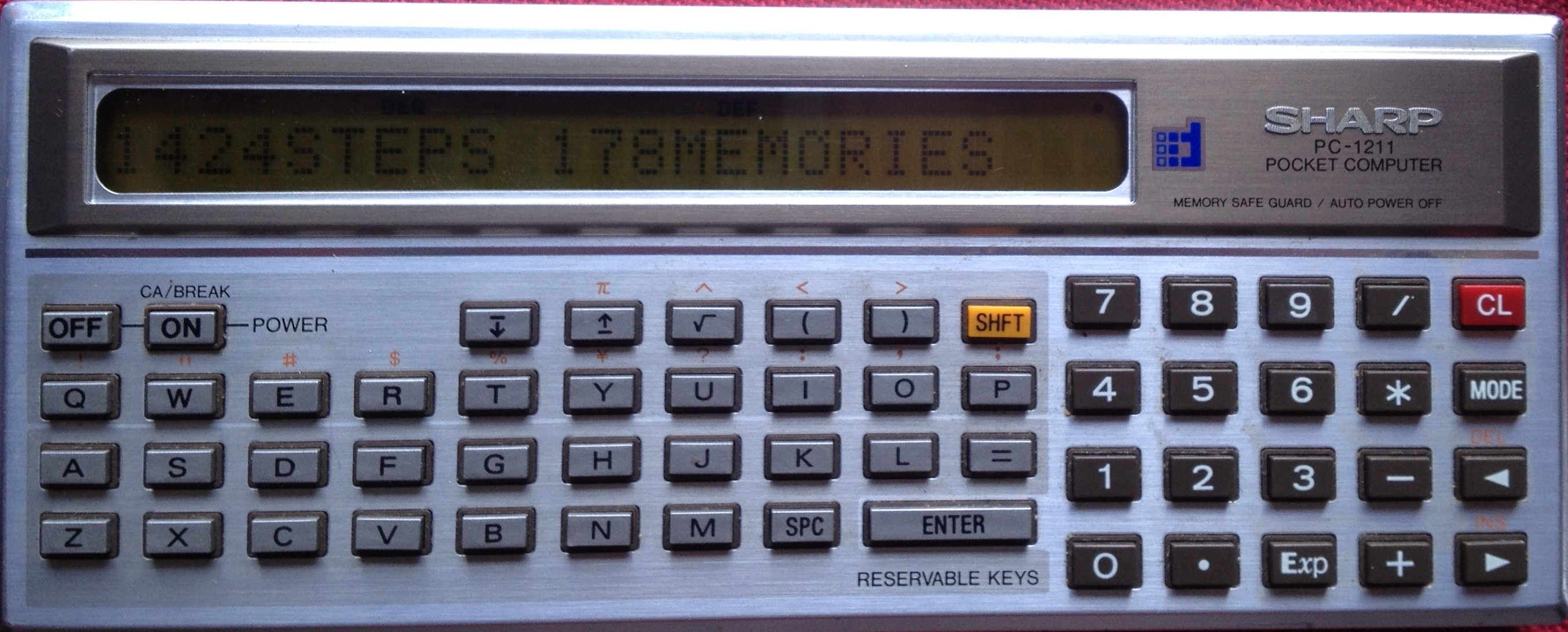
- Sharp PC-1211
- Manufacturer: Sharp Corporation
- Generation: First
- Released: March 1980; 46 years ago
- CPU: SC43177/SC43178 processors at 256 kHz
- Memory: three TC5514P 4 Kbit RAM modules
- Display: 24 digit dot matrix LCD
- Input: Full QWERTY-style keyboard
- Power: four MR44 1.35 V Mercury button cells
- Successor: Sharp PC-5000
- Related: Sharp PC-1500; Sharp PC-1251

The Sharp PC-1211 is the first pocket computer ever released, marketed by Sharp Corporation in March 1980. The computer was powered by two 4-bit CPUs laid out in power-saving CMOS circuitry. One acted as the main CPU, the other dealt with the input/output and display interface. Users could write computer programs in BASIC.

A badge-engineered version of the PC-1211, the TRS-80 Pocket Computer (model PC-1), was marketed by Radio Shack in July 1980 as the first iteration of the TRS-80 Pocket Computer with just a marginally different look (outer plastic parts in black, not brown, gray display frame)

== Technical specifications ==
- 24 digit dot matrix LCD
- Full QWERTY-style keyboard
- Integrated beeper
- Connector for printer and tape drive
- Programmable in BASIC
- Uses four MR44 1.35 V Mercury button cells
- Battery life in excess of 200 hours
- 1424 program steps, 26 permanent variable locations (A-Z or A$-Z$) and 178 variables shared with program steps
- Built out of off-the-shelf CMOS components, including SC43177/SC43178 processors at 256 kHz and three TC5514P 4 Kbit RAM modules

=== Accessories ===
- CE-121 Cassette Interface
- CE-122 Printer

== TRS-80 Pocket Computer ("PC-1") ==
A badge-engineered version of the Sharp PC-1211 was introduced in July 1980 and marketed by Radio Shack as the original TRS-80 Pocket Computer. This was later referred to as the "PC-1" to differentiate it from subsequent entries (PC-2 onwards) in the TRS-80 Pocket Computer line.

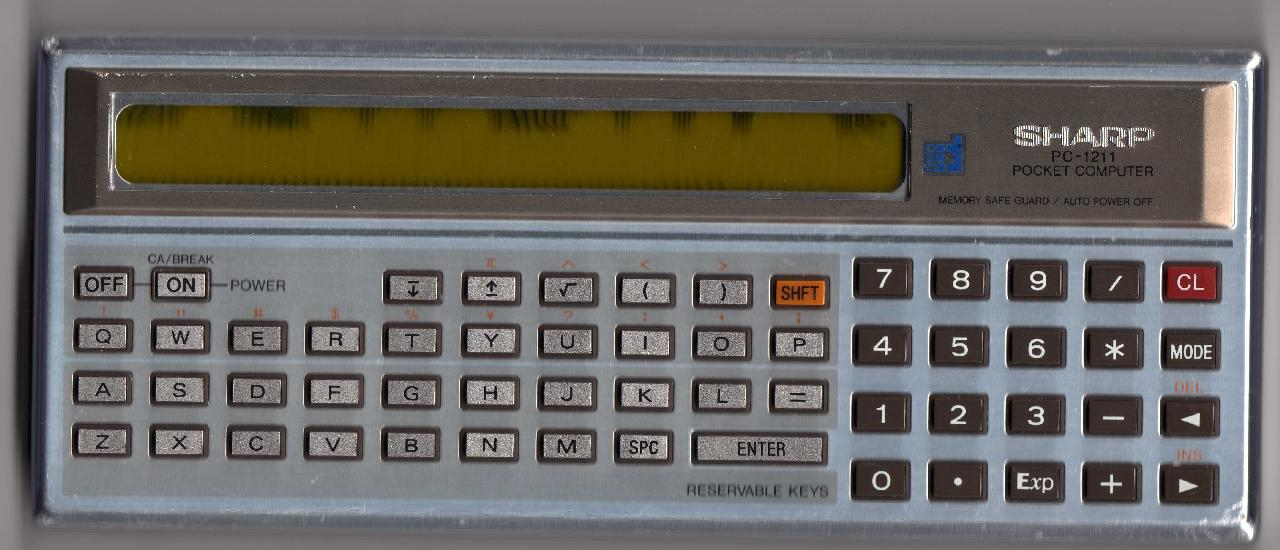
Sharp PC-1211. This example exhibits a display that is failing, a very common problem with Sharp's displays of the time.

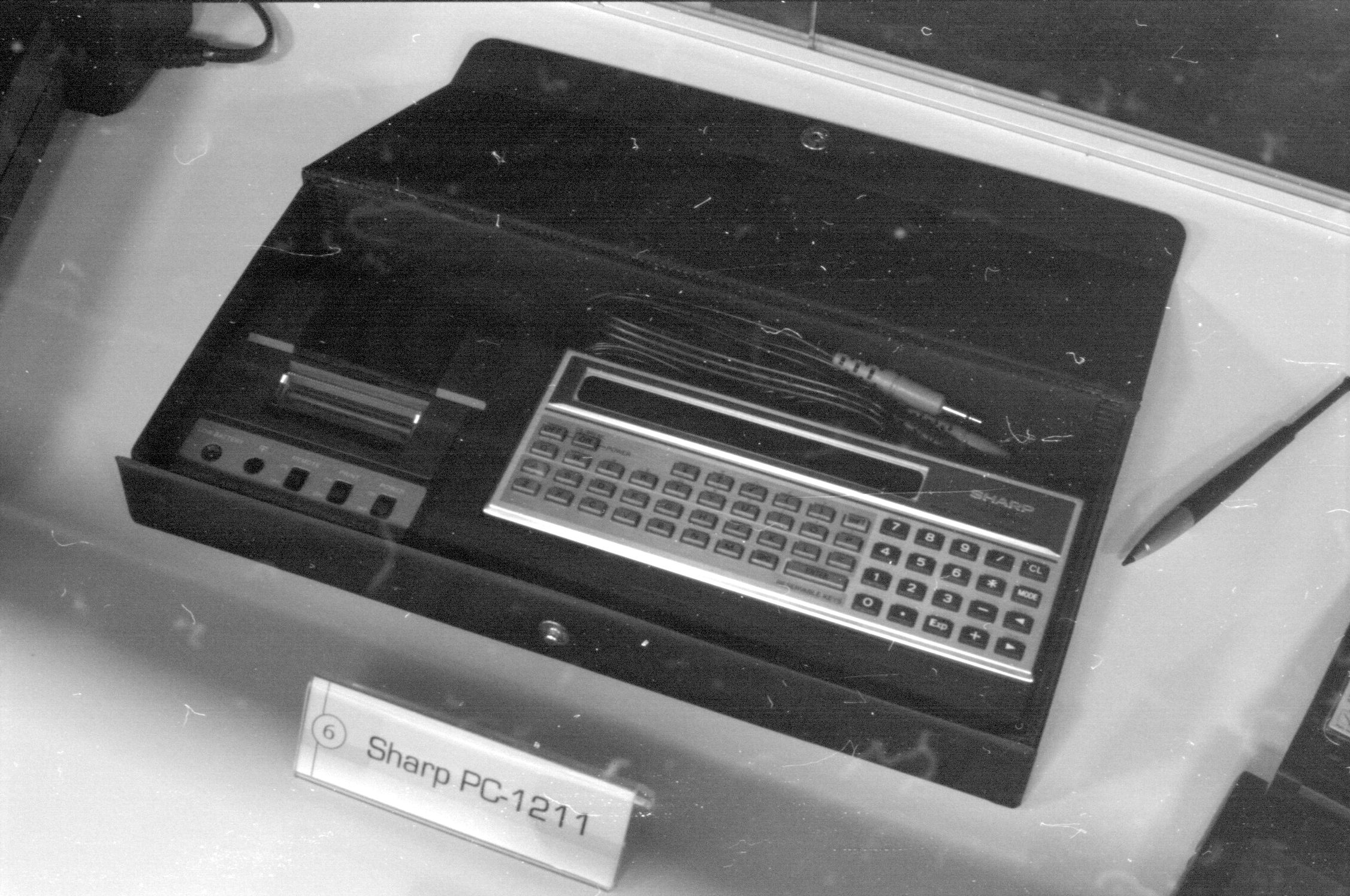
CE-122 printer in a travel case.

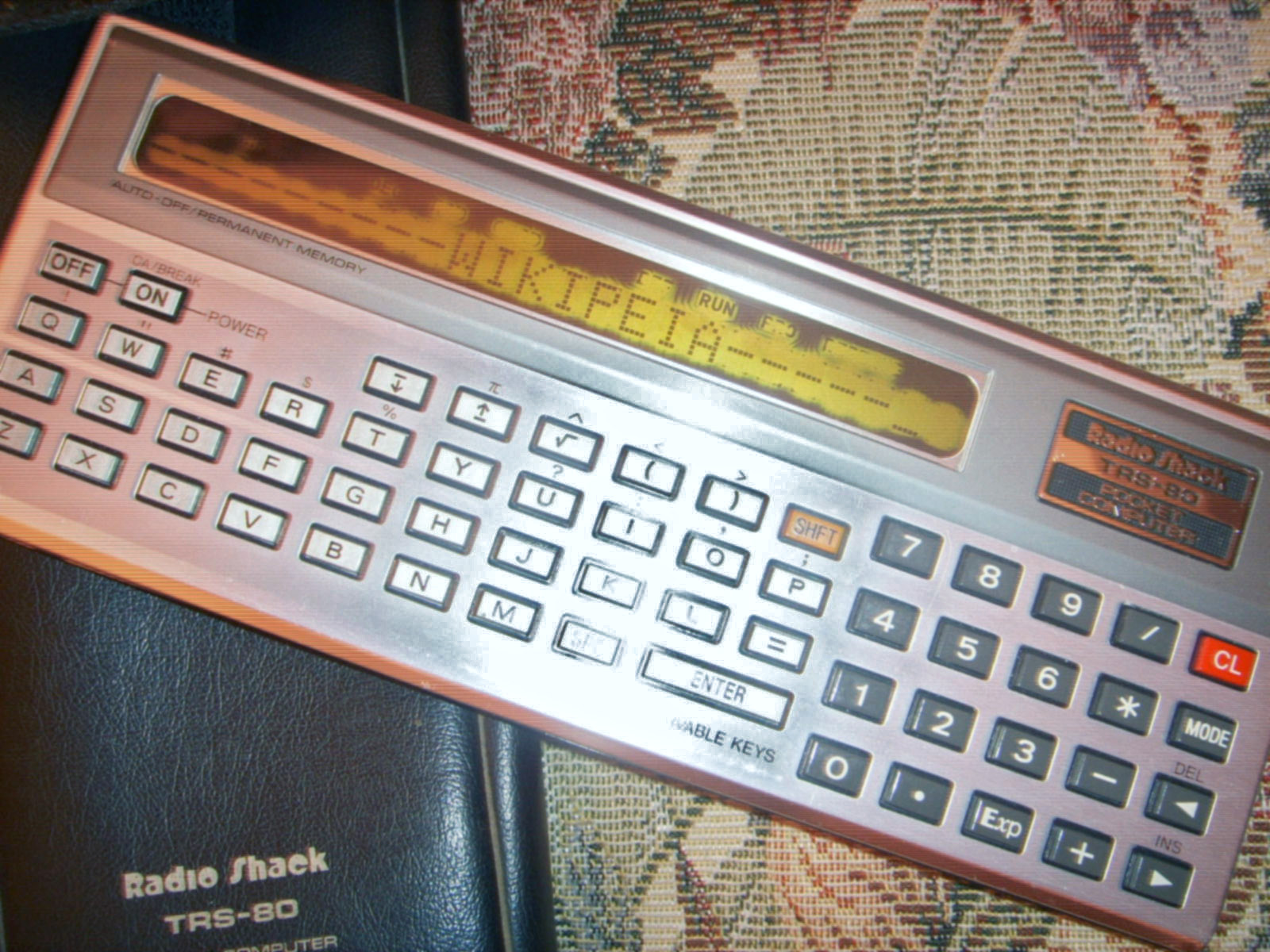
Rebadged "TRS-80 Pocket Computer PC-1" version.

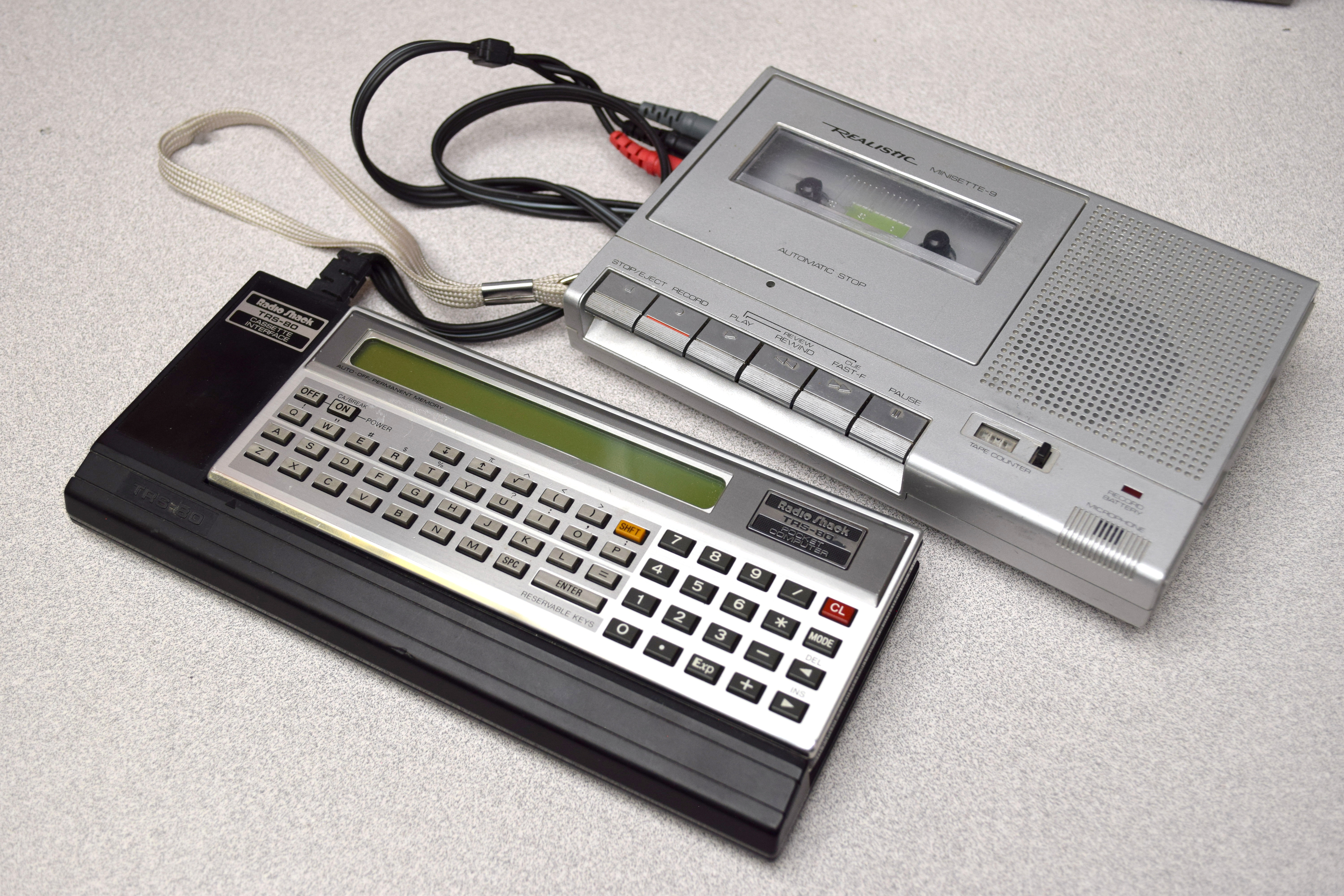
TRS-80 Pocket Computer with external cassette tape interface unit and Realistic Minisette 9

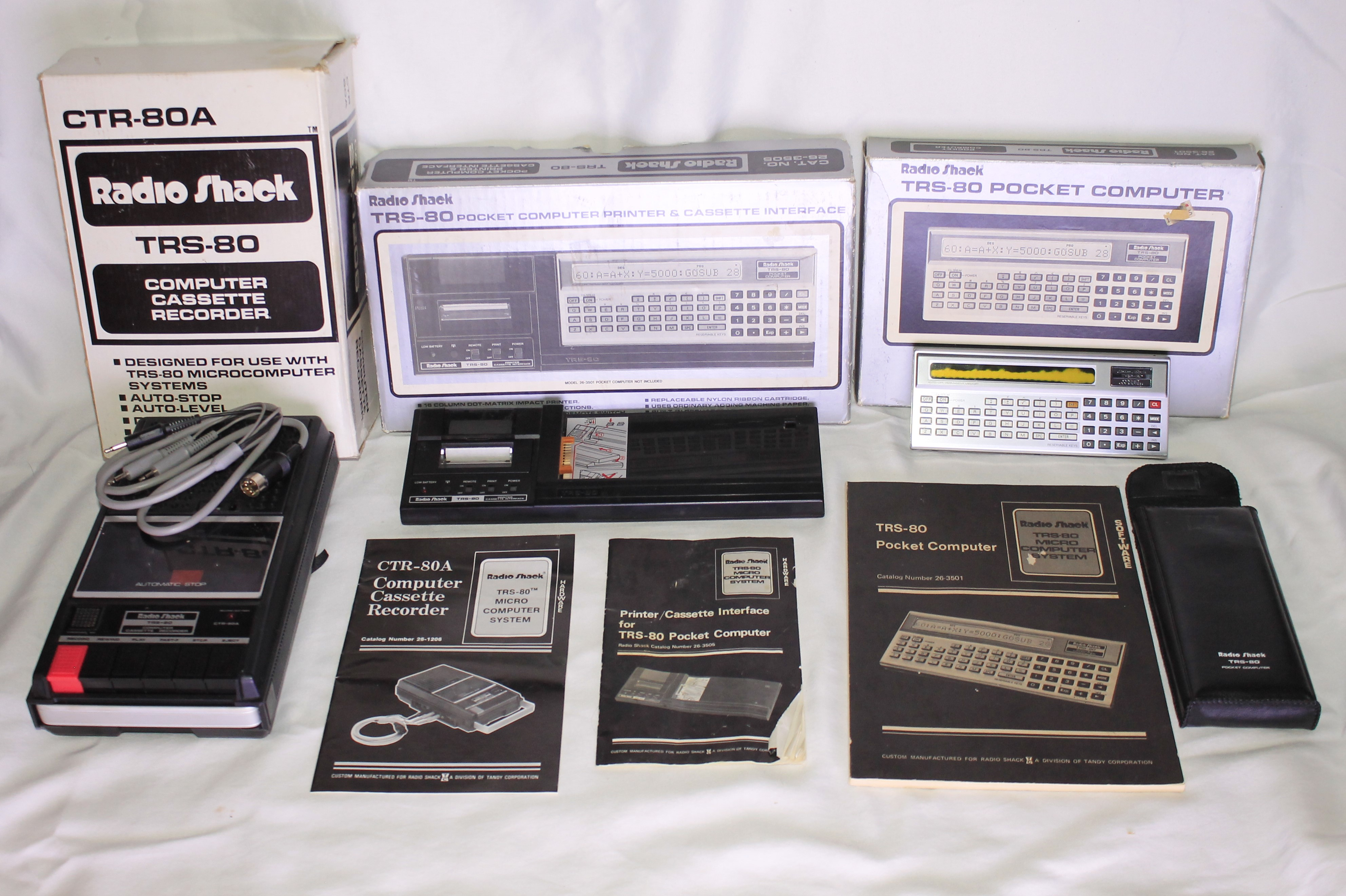
A TRS-80 PC-1 with printer & cassette interface and CTR-80A cassette recorder

== See also ==
- Sharp pocket computer character sets
