= Sharp PC-5000 =

Laptop computer

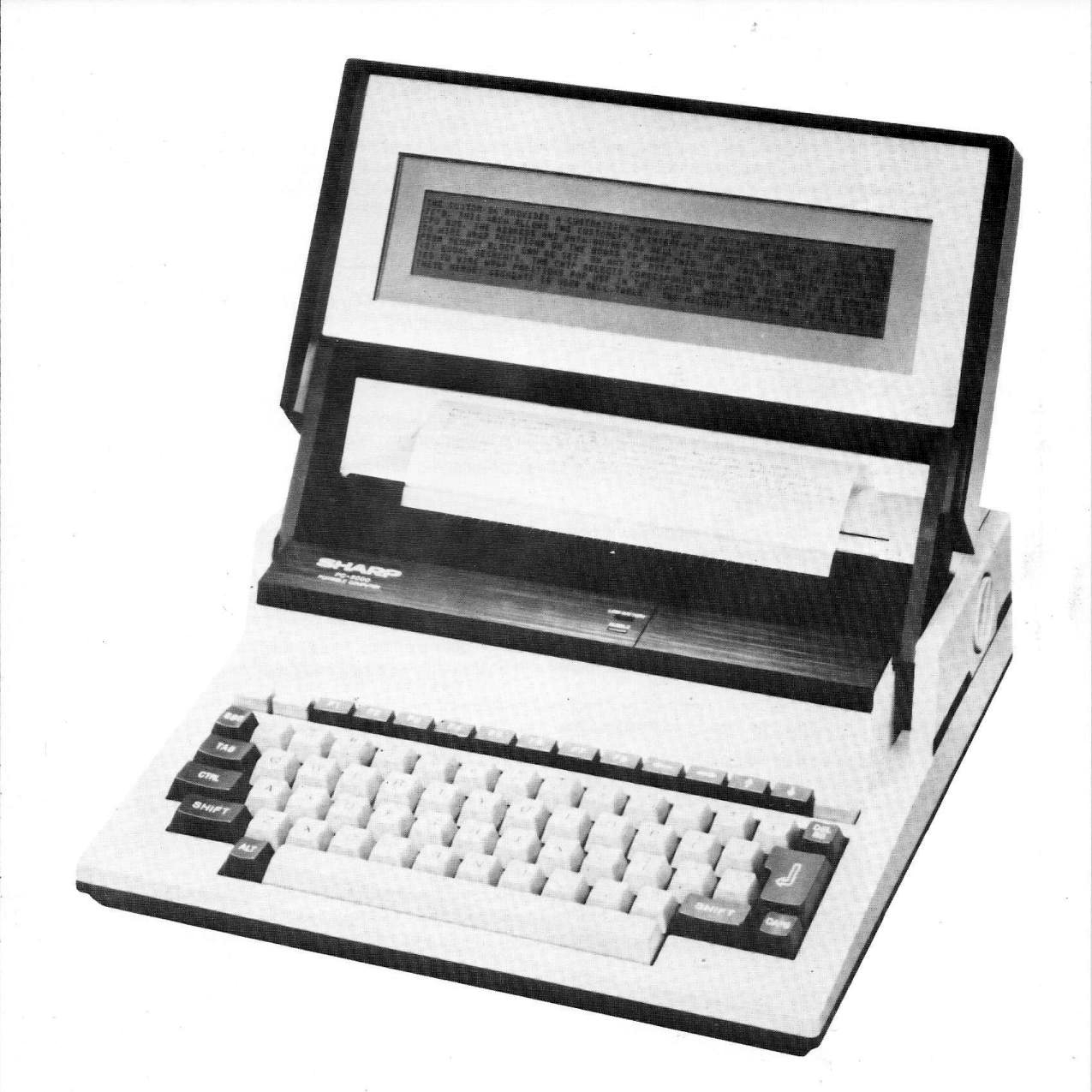
- Generation: Second
- Released: 11 November 1983; 42 years ago
- Lifespan: 11/11/1983 – 1986 (at least 2 years)
- Discontinued: 1986; 40 years ago
- Operating system: MS-DOS
- CPU: 4.77-MHz Intel 8088
- Memory: 128 kilobytes memory/bubble memory
- Display: 640×80-pixel (80-character by 8-line) LCD
- Weight: 5 kg (11 lb)
- Predecessor: Sharp PC-1500; Sharp PC-1211; Sharp PC-1251
- Successor: Sharp PC-7000

The Sharp PC-5000 was a pioneering laptop computer, announced by Sharp Corporation of Japan in November 1983. It employed a clamshell design in which the display closes over the keyboard, like the earlier GRiD Compass and contemporary Gavilan SC.

The PC-5000 was largely IBM PC-compatible, with the same 4.77-MHz Intel 8088 processor as the IBM PC, and ran MS-DOS 2.0 (in ROM). It had 128 kilobytes of internal memory (it was one of the few computers to use bubble memory), which could be expanded by the use of plug-in cartridges. The cartridge slots also accepted ROM cartridges containing software, such as the Extended BASIC programming language and the EasyPac software suite, which contained the EasyWrite II word processor, EasyReport reports program, and EasyComm terminal software for use with the internal modem. It featured a 640×80-pixel (80-character by 8-line) LCD, a full-travel keyboard, and an external dual 5.25-inch floppy disk drive. A notable feature of the computer was its built-in thermal printer, which could also be purchased separately and attached to the machine. It is perhaps due to this attachment that the case design of the PC-5000 owes much to that of electronic typewriters of its time.

While far more portable than the popular Compaq Portable or Osborne 1 computers, the machine weighed 5 kg (11 lb).

Sharp succeeded the PC-5000 with the fully IBM-compatible PC-7000 in late 1985.

== Reception ==
Your Computer magazine selected the PC-5000 as one of the best personal computers of 1983. Creative Computing chose the PC-5000 as the best notebook portable between $1,000 and $2,500 for 1984, although criticizing the difficulty of finding the computer in stores and questionable support from Sharp and third-party vendors.
