= Sharp PC-E500S =

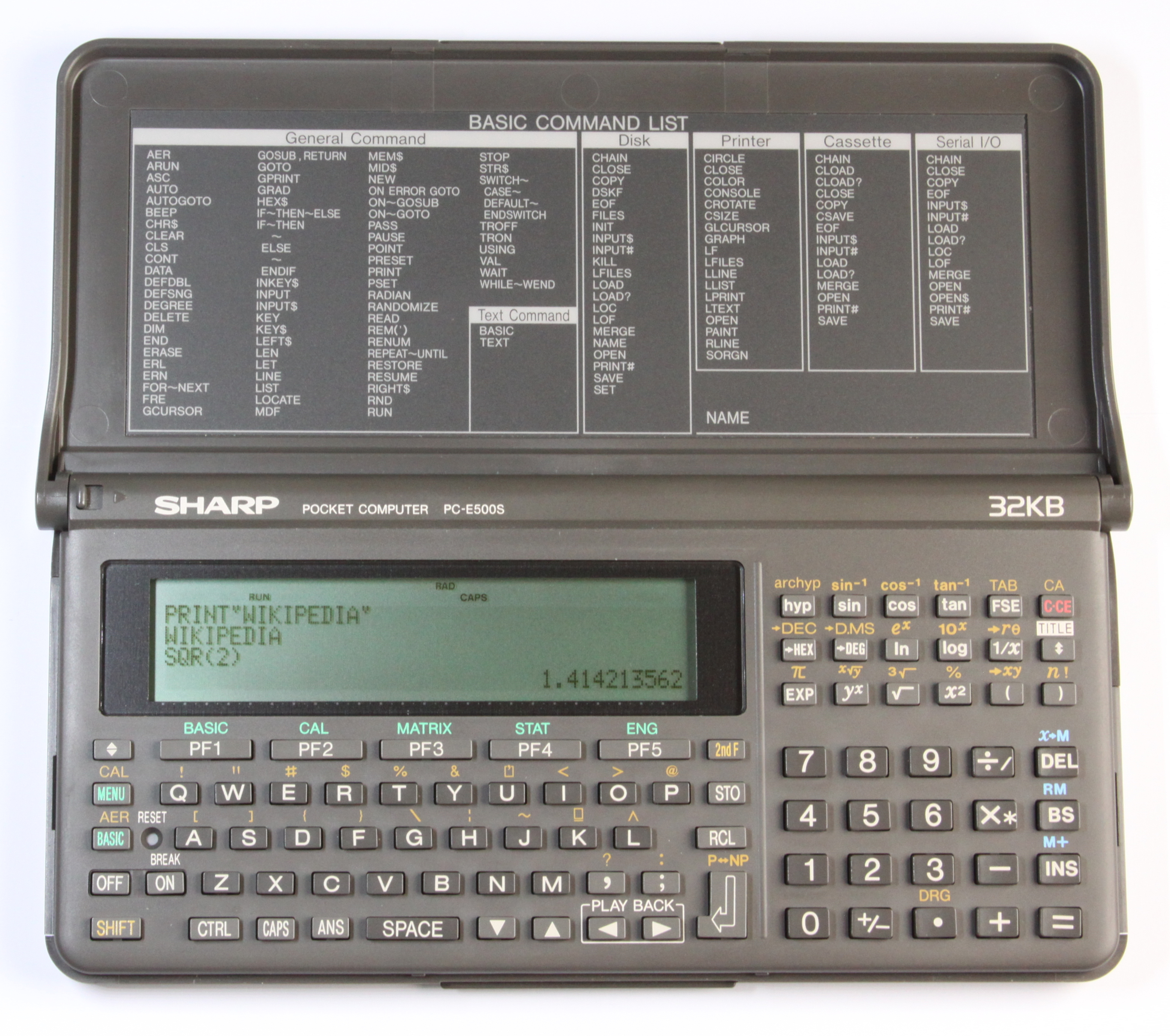
- Sharp PC-E500S in RUN mode (BASIC programming)
- Type: Pocket computer
- Introduced: 1995; 31 years ago
- Discontinued: 2003; 23 years ago (last known production run so far: 2001; 25 years ago)
- Predecessor: Sharp PC-E500

Calculator
- Entry mode: Infix, BASIC,
- Precision: 10 (single precision); 20 (double precision; not available in CAL, MATRIX, and STAT modes)
- Display type: LCD dot-matrix
- Display size: 4×40 characters

CPU
- Processor: Sharp SC62015
- Frequency: 2.304 MHz

Programming
- Programming language(s): BASIC
- User memory: 32 KB (built-in), custom-expandable to 256 KB
- Firmware memory: 256 KB

Interfaces
- Ports: 1 vendor-specific (serial/printer/disk drive) 1 TTL-level serial communications port

Other
- Power supply: 4× AAA; 1× CR2016
- Power consumption: 0.09 W
- Weight: 340 g (including lid and batteries)
- Dimensions: 22×10.45×1.9 cm (lid closed)

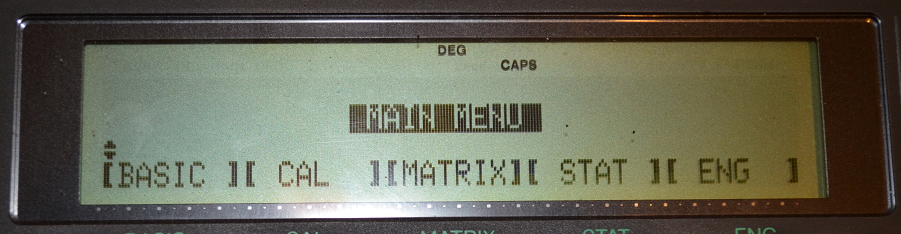
Main menu with BASIC, CAL, MATRIX, STAT, and ENG mode selection

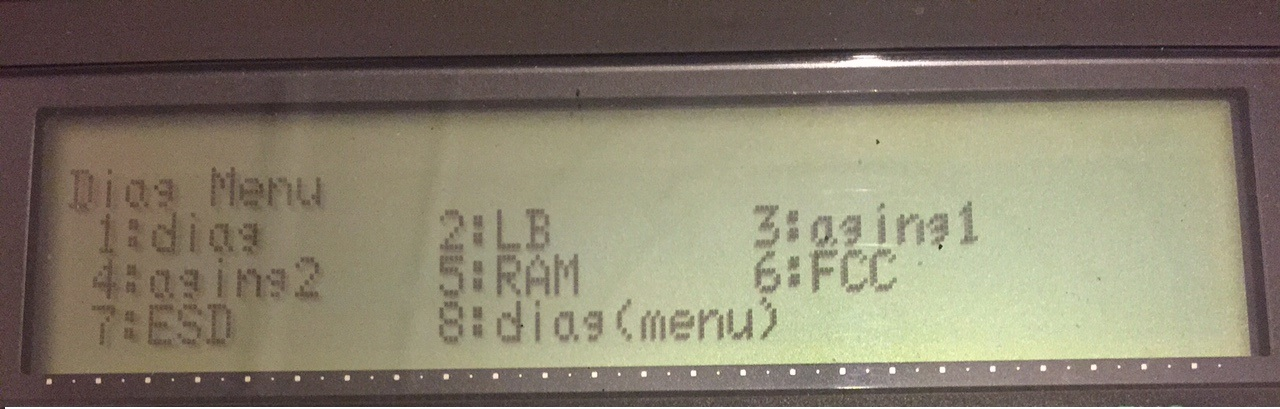
Diagnostic menu in ROM

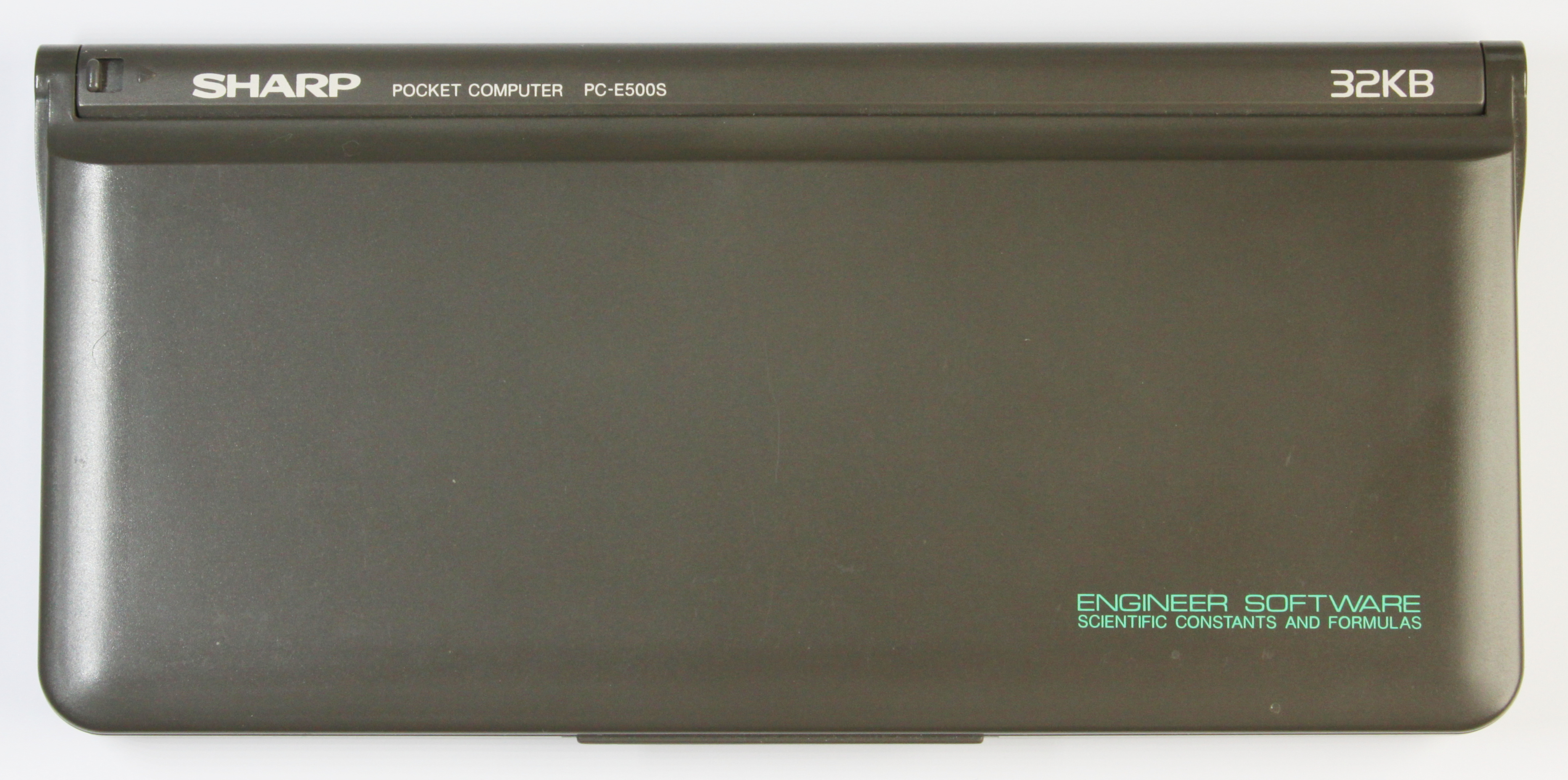
PC-E500S with closed lid

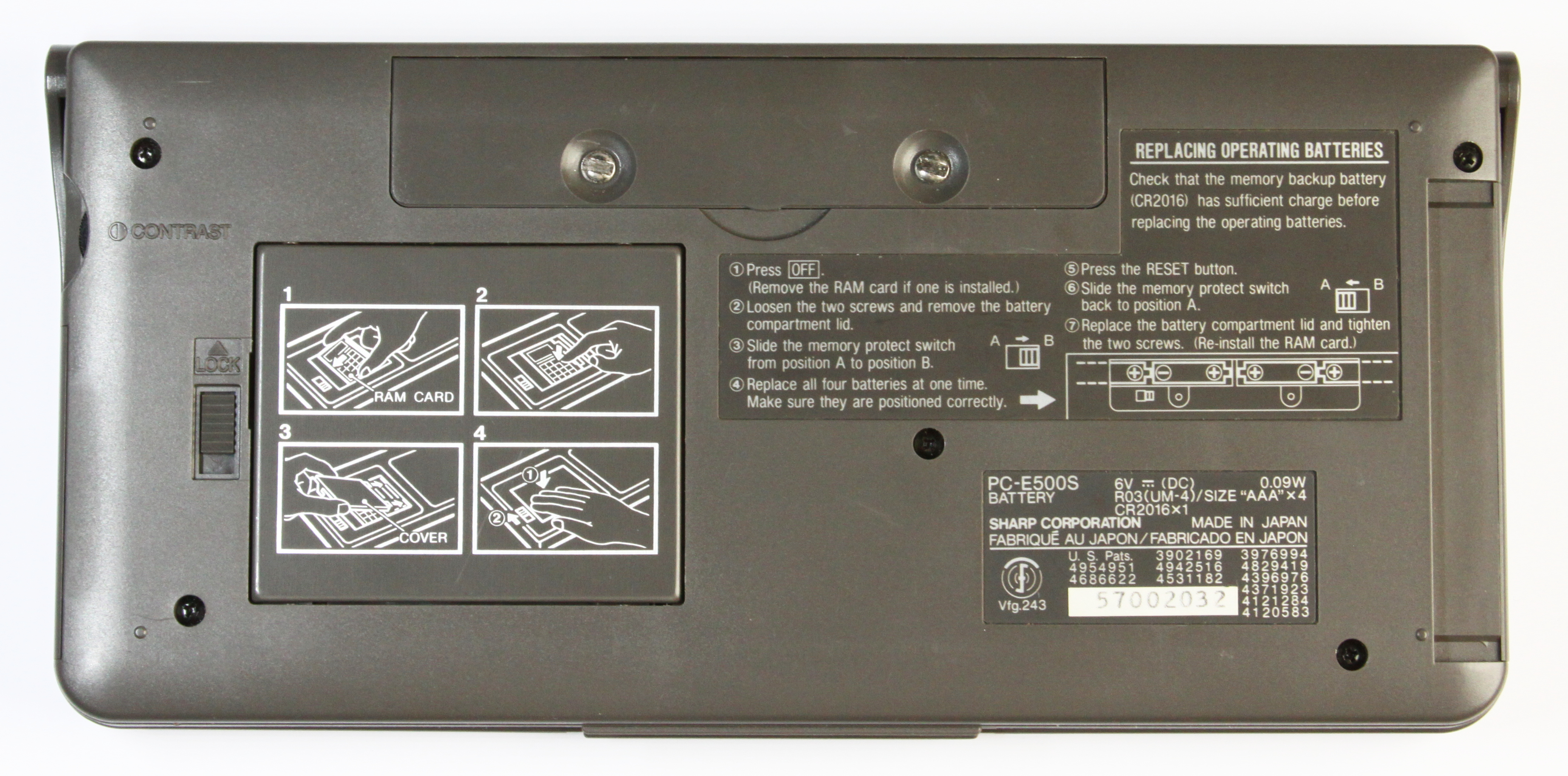
Bottom side

The Sharp PC-E500S is a 1995 pocket computer by Sharp Corporation which was the successor to the 1989 PC-E500 model, featuring a 2.304 MHz CMOS CPU.

== Description ==
It was slightly wider, and the keys are slightly larger than the previous model. The display had more contrast, and the keyboard cover is a (removable) hinged lid (clamshell) instead of plastic slipcase. There were also four additional BASIC commands (Multiline IF ... ENDIF, WHILE ... WEND, REPEAT ... UNTIL, SWITCH ... CASE ... ENDSWITCH)

It came with 32 KB of RAM which could be upgraded to 96 KB using memory expansion cards. The monochrome LCD had 240×32 pixels which could display four lines with 40 characters per line as well as graphics. The 256 KB system ROM that contained the BIOS, a diagnostic suite, and the BASIC interpreter used to program the device.

An algebraic calculation system was included. The Algebraic Expression Reserve (AER) memory: Frequently used formulas or constants could be stored in memory and recalled for repeated use. The PC-E500 series also performed as a scientific calculator when switched into 'CAL' mode.

It also included an X<>Y exchange key for working with complex numbers and polar to rectangular conversions.

== Applications ==
- Mathematics (integers, equations, differential & integral calculus, formulas and graphs)
- Physics
- Earth sciences
- Meteorology
- Chemistry
- Biology
- Geology
- Electrical engineering
- Mechanical engineering

In addition things like amino acids and the periodic table of elements were available. These built-in programs were accessed through a menu system and special function keys. There was also a built-in menu editor to add new software to the menus or indeed replace some built-in software or formulas.

== Operating modes ==
- BASIC (programming and execution)
- CAL (scientific calculator)
- MATRIX (matrices calculations)
- STAT (statistics)
- ENG (engineering)
- AER (algebraic expressions editor). This mode can be accessed from the second main menu page (press up/down arrow near the lower left display corner).

== Accuracy ==
- 10 digits (mantissa) + 2 digits (exponent) in single-precision mode.
- 20 digits (mantissa) + 2 digits (exponent) in double-precision mode.
- In the CAL, MATRIX and STAT modes, only the single precision mode can be used.

== Memory expansion ==
The Sharp PC-E500 series could store data and programs on memory expansion cards as well as the main RAM. Six cards were available:

- CE-210M: 2 KB
- CE-211M: 4 KB
- CE-212M: 8 KB
- CE-2H16M: 16 KB
- CE-2H32M: 32 KB
- CE-2H64M: 64 KB

These cards used a CR1616 lithium battery for memory backup.

The memory configuration was software-switchable from the command-line. The RAM card could be appended to the system memory, replace the system memory or act as a separate space to be used as a RAM drive (F:). The main memory could also be partitioned off to a RAM drive (E:).

== Peripherals ==
- CE-126P: Thermal printer & cassette interface.
- CE-140F: 2.5-inch pocket floppy drive.
- CE-130T: RS-232 adaptor level converter.
- CE-135T: RS-232 adaptor level converter. (Macintosh)
- CE-515: 4-color X/Y plotter printer

The PC-E500S had a weight of 340 g (with batteries) and was powered by four AAA batteries. It could, given its power consumption of 0.09 W, be used for about 70 hours on a charge.

== Variants ==
- PC-E500 (English): 32 KB, engineer software, double precision, slipcase, rubber keys, black, 1988/1989
- PC-E500 (Japanese): 32 KB, engineer software, double precision, Katakana, slipcase, rubber keys, black, 1988
- PC-E500PJ / PC-E500-BL (Japanese): 32 KB, engineer software, game "HEAVY METAL mini" (by CRISIS Software) preloaded into RAM, double precision, Katakana, slipcase, rubber keys, blue, 1990, limited special edition by Pokecom Journal (PJ)
- PC-E500S (English): 32 KB, engineer software, double precision, high contrast display, clamshell, plastic keys, black, 1995
- PC-E550 (Japanese): 64 KB, engineer software, double precision, Katakana, slipcase, rubber keys, white, 1990
- PC-E650 (Japanese): 64 KB, engineer software, double precision, structured BASIC, Katakana, clamshell, plastic keys, black, 1993
- PC-1480U (Japanese): 32 KB, no engineer software, "coop uni" label, double precision, Kanji, slipcase, rubber keys, black, 1988
- PC-1490U (Japanese): 32 KB, no engineer software, "coop uni" label, double precision, Kanji, slipcase, rubber keys, black, 1990
- PC-1490UII (Japanese): 64 KB, no engineer software, "UNIV. TOOL" label, double precision, Kanji, slipcase, rubber keys?, black, 1991
- PC-U6000 (Japanese): 64 KB, no engineer software, "UNIV. TOOL" label, double precision, Kanji, clamshell, plastic keys, black, 1993

== See also ==
- Sharp pocket computer character sets
