= Sharp pocket computer character sets =

8-bit character sets used by Sharp computers

The Sharp pocket computer character sets are a number of 8-bit character sets used by various Sharp pocket computers and calculators in the 1980s and mid 1990s.

== Character sets ==
=== PC-12xx and PC-14xx series ===
The Sharp PC-14xx series (like the Sharp PC-1403 (1986), PC-1403H or PC-1475) uses an 8-bit extended ASCII character set. With minor exceptions the lower half resembles the 7-bit ASCII character set. The upper half contains a full set of half-width Katakana glyphs as well as a number of graphical and mathematical symbols. The Japanese glyphs are not documented and are available only after enabling an undocumented Japanese mode.

Sharp PC-14xx character set
	0	1	2	3	4	5	6	7	8	9	A	B	C	D	E	F
0x	NUL	SOH	C-CE/ CL/ CLS	CA	EOT	ENQ	ACK	BRK	BASIC/ MODE	CAL	DEF	INS	DEL	ENTER	► 25BA	◄ 25C4
1x	DLE	DC1	DC2	DC3	DC4	NAK	SYN	ETB	CAN	EM	SUB	ESC	FS	GS	RS	US
2x	SP	!	"	#	$	%	&	'	(	)	*	+	,	-	.	/
3x	0	1	2	3	4	5	6	7	8	9	:	;	<	=	>	?
4x	@	A	B	C	D	E	F	G	H	I	J	K	L	M	N	O
5x	P	Q	R	S	T	U	V	W	X	Y	Z	[	\/◣/¥	]		_
6x	`	a	b	c	d	e	f	g	h	i	j	k	l	m	n	o
7x	p	q	r	s	t	u	v	w	x	y	z	{	|	}	~/¯	DEL
8x	MDF [EOF]	REC [DSKF]	POL [LOF]	ROT [LOC]	DECI	HEX	TEN	RCP	SQU	CUR	HSN	HCS	HTN	AHS	AHC	AHT
9x	FACT	LN	LOG	EXP	SQR	SIN	COS	TAN	INT	ABS	SGN	DEG	DMS	ASN	ACS	ATN
Ax	RND	AND [XOR]	OR	NOT	ASC	VAL	LEN	PEEK	CHR$ [RENUM]	STR$ [DELETE]	MID$	LEFT$	RIGHT$	INKEY$	PI	MEM
Bx	RUN [FILES]	NEW; NEW# [LFILES]	CONT [INIT]	PASS [KILL]	LIST; LIST# [NAME]	LLIST; LLIST# [SET]	CSAVE, CSAVE M [COPY]	CLOAD, CLOAD M, CLOAD?	MERGE/ ACC	EQU#/ ARMT	MEM#/ COMP	OPEN/ MDF?	CLOSE/ EFF	SAVE/ APR	LOAD/ DAYSI	CONSOLE/ DAYSII
Cx	RANDOM	DEGREE	RADIAN	GRAD	BEEP	WAIT	GOTO	TRON	TROFF	CLEAR	USING	DIM	CALL	POKE	CLS/ BGNON	CURSOR/ BGNOFF
Dx	TO	STEP	THEN	ON	IF	FOR	LET	REM	END	NEXT	STOP	READ	DATA	PAUSE	PRINT, PRINT#	INPUT, INPUT#
Ex	GOSUB [OUTPUT]	AREAD [APPEND]	LPRINT [AS]	RETURN	RESTORE	CHAIN/ ERASE	GCURSOR	GPRINT	LINE	POINT	PSET	PRESET	BASIC	TEXT	OPEN$	Alt. prefix
Fx	0̸ 0030 0338	年 5E74	月 6708	日 65E5	円 5186	♠ 2660	♥ 2665	♦ 2666	♣ 2663	■ 25A0	□/⬚ 25A1	π 03C0	√ 221A		Japan prefix	

Sharp CE-126P printer character set (prefixed with 0xFE)
	0	1	2	3	4	5	6	7	8	9	A	B	C	D	E	F
0x	NUL	≠ 2260	Σ/∑ 03A3	ℂ 2102	ℙ 2119	𝔼 1D53C	ₘ 2098	_{M̄}	BS	Ⅱ/¶ 2161	LF	◣ 25E3	◿ 25FF	CR	θ 03B8	⥤ 2964
1x	+ 002B	- 002D	× 00D7	÷ 00F7	= 003D	⋄/◊ 22C4	≥ 2265	– 2010	√ 221A	π/Π; 03C0	⥮ 296E	→ 2192	← 2190	↑ 2191	↓ 2193	O/℺ 004F
2x	SP	!	"	#	$	%	&	'	(	)	*	+	,	-	.	/
3x	0	1	2	3	4	5	6	7	8	9	:	;	<	=	>	?
4x	@	A	B	C	D	E	F	G	H	I	J	K	L	M	N	O
5x	P	Q	R	S	T	U	V	W	X	Y	Z	[	¥ 00A5	]		_
6x	`	a	b	c	d	e	f	g	h	i	j	k	l	m	n	o
7x	p	q	r	s	t	u	v	w	x	y	z	{	|/¦	}	~	▒ 2592
8x	⁰ 2070	¹ 00B9	² 00B2	³ 00B3	⁴ 2074	⁵ 2075	⁶ 2076	⁷ 2077	⁸ 2078	⁹ 2079	¹⁰; 00B9	¹¹; 00B9	¹²; 00B9	♪ 266A	㏂ 33C2	㏘ 33D8
9x	⁺ 207A	⁻ 207B	^{⨯}	^{÷}	^{/}		^{−1}		⁽ 207D	⁾ 207E	ˣ	␣ 2423	x̅/ā 0078	⅂/¬ 2142	"/“/″ 0022	¯ 00AF
Ax	NBSP	｡ FF61	｢ FF62	｣ FF63	､ FF64	･ FF65	ｦ FF66	ｧ FF67	ｨ FF68	ｩ FF69	ｪ FF6A	ｫ FF6B	ｬ FF6C	ｭ FF6D	ｮ FF6E	ｯ FF6F
Bx	ｰ FF70	ｱ FF71	ｲ FF72	ｳ FF73	ｴ FF74	ｵ FF75	ｶ FF76	ｷ FF77	ｸ FF78	ｹ FF79	ｺ FF7A	ｻ FF7B	ｼ FF7C	ｽ FF7D	ｾ FF7E	ｿ FF7F
Cx	ﾀ FF80	ﾁ FF81	ﾂ FF82	ﾃ FF83	ﾄ FF84	ﾅ FF85	ﾆ FF86	ﾇ FF87	ﾈ FF88	ﾉ FF89	ﾊ FF8A	ﾋ FF8B	ﾌ FF8C	ﾍ FF8D	ﾎ FF8E	ﾏ FF8F
Dx	ﾐ FF90	ﾑ FF91	ﾒ FF92	ﾓ FF93	ﾔ FF94	ﾕ FF95	ﾖ FF96	ﾗ FF97	ﾘ FF98	ﾙ FF99	ﾚ FF9A	ﾛ FF9B	ﾜ FF9C	ﾝ FF9D	ﾞ FF9E	ﾟ FF9F
Ex	Ä 00C4	Ë 00CB	Ü 00DC	Ï 00CF	Ö 00D6	À 00C0	È 00C8	Ù 00D9	Â 00C2	Ê 00CA	Û 00DB	Î 00CE	Ô 00D4	É 00C9	Ç 00C7	ß 00DF
Fx	0̸ 0030	年 5E74	月 6708	日 65E5	円 5186	♠ 2660	♥ 2665	♦ 2666	♣ 2663	α 03B1	β 03B2	γ 03B3	σ 03C3	λ 03BB	δ 03B4	£ 00A3

=== PC-150x series ===
The Sharp PC-1500 series uses a 7-bit character set derived from ASCII. Differences show the Unicode code point below the glyph.

Sharp PC-1500A character set
	0	1	2	3	4	5	6	7	8	9	A	B	C	D	E	F
0x	NUL	SOH	STX	ETX	EOT	ENQ	ACK	BEL	BS	HT	LF	VT	FF	CR	SO	SI
1x	DLE	DC1	DC2	DC3	DC4	NAK	SYN	ETB	CAN	EM	SUB	ESC	FS	GS	RS	US
2x	SP	!	"	#	$	%	&	□/⬚ 25A1	(	)	*	+	,	-	.	/
3x	0	1	2	3	4	5	6	7	8	9	:	;	<	=	>	?
4x	@	A	B	C	D	E	F	G	H	I	J	K	L	M	N	O
5x	P	Q	R	S	T	U	V	W	X	Y	Z	√ 221A	¥ 00A5	π 03C0		_
6x	`	a	b	c	d	e	f	g	h	i	j	k	l	m	n	o
7x	p	q	r	s	t	u	v	w	x	y	z	{	|	}	~	■ 25A0

=== PC-160x series ===
The Sharp PC-1600 supports two character sets. In "MODE 0", the character set resembles code page 437, whereas in "MODE 1" certain code points are changed to become compatible with the character set of the predecessor, the PC-1500.

=== PC-E220 series ===
The Sharp PC-E220 uses an 8-bit character set where the lower half resembles ASCII and the upper half contains various Greek letters, super- and subscript digits as well as various mathematical symbols.

=== PC-E500 series ===
The Sharp PC-E500 (1989) and PC-E500S (1995) use an 8-bit character set almost identical to the IBM PC code page 437. Differences are highlighted.

Sharp PC-E500(S) character set
	0	1	2	3	4	5	6	7	8	9	A	B	C	D	E	F
0x	NUL	SOH	STX	ETX	EOT	ENQ	ACK	BEL	BS	HT	LF	VT	FF	CR	SO	SI
1x	DLE	DC1	DC2	DC3	DC4	NAK	SYN	ETB	CAN	EM	SUB	ESC	→ 2192	← 2190	↑ 2191	↓ 2193
2x	SP	!	"	#	$	%	&	'	(	)	*	+	,	-	.	/
3x	0	1	2	3	4	5	6	7	8	9	:	;	<	=	>	?
4x	@	A	B	C	D	E	F	G	H	I	J	K	L	M	N	O
5x	P	Q	R	S	T	U	V	W	X	Y	Z	[	\	]		_
6x	`	a	b	c	d	e	f	g	h	i	j	k	l	m	n	o
7x	p	q	r	s	t	u	v	w	x	y	z	{	|	}	~	⌂ 2302
8x	Ç 00C7	ü 00FC	é 00E9	â 00E2	ä 00E4	à 00E0	å 00E5	ç 00E7	ê 00EA	ë 00EB	è 00E8	ï 00EF	î 00EE	ì 00EC	Ä 00C4	Å 00C5
9x	É 00C9	æ 00E6	Æ 00C6	ô 00F4	ö 00F6	ò 00F2	û 00FB	ù 00F9	ÿ 00FF	Ö 00D6	Ü 00DC	¢ 00A2	£ 00A3	¥ 00A5	₧ 20A7	ƒ 0192
Ax	á 00E1	í 00ED	ó 00F3	ú 00FA	ñ 00F1	Ñ 00D1	ª 00AA	º 00BA	¿ 00BF	⌐ 2310	¬ 00AC	½ 00BD	¼ 00BC	¡ 00A1	« 00AB	» 00BB
Bx	░ 2591	▒ 2592	▓ 2593	│ 2502	┤ 2524	╡ 2561	╢ 2562	╖ 2556	╕ 2555	╣ 2563	║ 2551	╗ 2557	╝ 255D	╜ 255C	╛ 255B	┐ 2510
Cx	└ 2514	┴ 2534	┬ 252C	├ 251C	─ 2500	┼ 253C	╞ 255E	╟ 255F	╚ 255A	╔ 2554	╩ 2569	╦ 2566	╠ 2560	═ 2550	╬ 256C	╧ 2567
Dx	╨ 2568	╤ 2564	╥ 2565	╙ 2559	╘ 2558	╒ 2552	╓ 2553	╫ 256B	╪ 256A	┘ 2518	┌ 250C	█ 2588	▄ 2584	▌ 258C	▐ 2590	▀ 2580
Ex	α 03B1	ß 00DF	Γ 0393	π 03C0	Σ 03A3	σ 03C3	μ 00B5	τ 03C4	Φ 03A6	Θ 0398	Ω 03A9	δ 03B4	∞ 221E	φ 03C6	ε 03B5	∩ 2229
Fx	≡ 2261	± 00B1	≥ 2265	≤ 2264	⌠ 2320	⌡ 2321	÷ 00F7	≈ 2248	° 00B0	∙ 2219	· 00B7	√ 221A	ⁿ 207F	² 00B2	■ 25A0	NBSP; 00A0

== See also ==
- Calculator character sets
