= DM-41 =

DM-41 may refer to:

- Diehl DM-41, a HE-frag shell for use with some Heckler & Koch's grenade launchers
- SwissMicros DM41, a miniature scientific calculator resembling the HP-41CX in 2015
