= HP calculator character set =

HP calculator character set refers to various calculator character sets used in calculators manufactured by Hewlett-Packard.

These include:

- FOCAL character set, a character set used by some calculators supporting the FOCAL programming language between 1979 and 1995
- Modified HP Roman-8, a variant of Hewlett-Packard's Roman-8 used on some calculators between 1986 and 2015
- RPL character set, a character set used on various Hewlett-Packard RPL calculators between 1989 and 2015
- Unicode, a character set used on some new calculators since 2011 (39gII, Prime) (Note: This implementation of Unicode makes use of six private-use codepoints for characters that are either supplementary plane characters or character sequences: U+E000: <U+0078 U+0304> x̄ U+E001: <U+0070 U+0302> p̂ U+E003: U+1D48A 𝒊 (i) U+E004: <U+207B U+00B9> ^{−1} U+E005: U+1D499 𝒙 (x) U+E006: U+1D49A 𝒚 (y))

== See also ==
- Calculator character sets
