= FOCAL character set =

Character set used by calculators

In computing FOCAL character set refers to a group of 8-bit single byte character sets introduced by Hewlett-Packard since 1979. It was used in several RPN calculators supporting the FOCAL programming language, like the HP-41C/CV/CX as well as the later HP-42S, which was introduced in 1988 and produced up to 1995. As such, it is also used by SwissMicros' DM41/L, both introduced in 2015, and is implicitly supported by the DM42, introduced in 2017 (although the later calculator utilizes Free42, which is based on Unicode internally).

== Character set ==
The character set is derived from ASCII, but with the control code range and some high bit characters replaced by various special characters.

FOCAL character set (HP-41C/CV/CX / HP 82143A)
	0	1	2	3	4	5	6	7	8	9	A	B	C	D	E	F
0x	‾/♦	×	x̅/ā	←	α	β	Γ	↓	Δ	σ	♦	λ	µ/μ	∡/∠	τ	Φ
1x	θ	Ω	δ	Å	å	Ä	ä	Ö	ö	Ü	ü	Æ	æ	≠	£/₤	▒
2x	SP	!	"	#	$	%	&	'	(	)	*	+	,	-	.	/
3x	0	1	2	3	4	5	6	7	8	9	:	;	<	=	>	?
4x	@	A	B	C	D	E	F	G	H	I	J	K	L	M	N	O
5x	P	Q	R	S	T	U	V	W	X	Y	Z	[	\	]	↑/	_
6x	`/⊤	a	b	c	d	e	f	g	h	i	j	k	l	m	n	o
7x	p	q	r	s	t	u	v	w	x	y	z	π	|	→	Σ	⊦ (Note: The glyph at code point 127 (⊦) is called APPEND character in Hewlett-Packard terminology. In the HP-41C/CV/CX and HP-42S series of calculators, it is used to indicate that the following characters will be appended to the alpha register rather than replacing the existing contents of the register.)

Characters not in all versions

When Hewlett-Packard introduced the HP-42S in 1988, the FOCAL character set was revised to include more characters, including a number of characters already provided by the HP 82240A infrared thermo printer, which had been introduced in 1986, as part of its extended variant of the 1985 revision of the HP Roman-8 character set, although at completely different code points.

There is no code point definition for the euro sign in this character set.

Revised FOCAL character set (HP-42S)
	0	1	2	3	4	5	6	7	8	9	A	B	C	D	E	F
0x	÷	×	√	∫	░	Σ	▶ (Note: The glyph at code point 6 is called GOOSE character in Hewlett-Packard terminology. While U+25B6 (▶) is the preferred Unicode character for maximum cross-compatibility with established RPL character set mappings, Free42 since release 2.0.1 (2017-04-23) maps to U+25B8 (▸) instead.)	π	¿	≤	LF/EOT	≥	≠	↵	↓	→
1x	←	µ/μ	£/₤	°	Å	Ñ	Ä	∡/∠	ᴇ/⏨	Æ	…/‥	␛	Ö	Ü	▒	■/·
2x	SP	!	"	#	$	%	&	'	(	)	*	+	,	-	.	/
3x	0	1	2	3	4	5	6	7	8	9	:	;	<	=	>	?
4x	@	A	B	C	D	E	F	G	H	I	J	K	L	M	N	O
5x	P	Q	R	S	T	U	V	W	X	Y	Z	[	\	]	↑/	_
6x	`	a	b	c	d	e	f	g	h	i	j	k	l	m	n	o
7x	p	q	r	s	t	u	v	w	x	y	z	{	|	}	~	⊦
8x	¦?	¥?	▓?								␊					

Translation from HP-42S character set to the modified HP Roman-8 (supported by HP 82240A etc.) character set:

HP translation vector
	0	1	2	3	4	5	6	7	8	9	A	B	C	D	E	F
0x	0x81	0x82	0x83	0x84	0x04	0x85	0x86	0x87	0x08	0x89	0x04	0x8A	0x8B	0x0D	0x0E	0x8D
1x	0x8E	0x8F	0xAF	0xB3	0xA2	0xB6	0xD8	0xA0	0x18	0xD3	0x9B	0x1B	0xDA	0xDB	0x7F	0xF2
7x	0x70	0x71	0x72	0x73	0x74	0x75	0x76	0x77	0x78	0x79	0x7A	0x7B	0x7C	0x7D	0x7E	0x94
8x	0x80	0x81	0x82	0x83	0x84	0x85	0x86	0x87	0x88	0x89	0x90	0x8B	0x8C	0x8D	0x8E	0x8F

== See also ==
- Hewlett-Packard calculator character sets
