= Calculator character set =

A calculator character set is a character encoding scheme for a calculator.

Examples include:

- Casio calculator character sets, character sets used by Casio calculators
- Hewlett-Packard calculator character sets, character sets used by Hewlett-Packard calculators
- Sharp calculator character sets, character sets used by Sharp calculators
- Texas Instruments calculator character sets, character sets used by Texas Instruments calculators
