= TI calculator character sets =

Digital text encoding

In computing, a character set is a system of assigning numbers to characters so that text can be represented as a list of numbers (which are then stored, for example, as a file). For example, ASCII assigns the hexadecimal number 41, or 65 in base 10, to "A". As part of the design process, Texas Instruments (TI) decided to modify the base Latin-1 character set for use with its calculator interface. By adding symbols to the character set, it was possible to reduce design complexity as much more complex parsing would have to have been used otherwise.

== TI-83 Plus/84 Plus Series ==
Code points 0xDF to 0xF0 differ between the small font and large font.

TI-83 Plus character set
	0	1	2	3	4	5	6	7	8	9	A	B	C	D	E	F
0x		𝘯 1D62F	u	v	w	▶ 25B6	⬆ 2B06	⬇ 2B07	∫ 222B	× 00D7	▫︎ 25AB	˖ 02D6	· 00B7	ᴛ 1D1B	³ 00B3	𝗙 1D5D9
1x	√ 221A	⁻¹; 207B 00B9	² 00B2	∠ 2220	° 00B0	ʳ 02B3	ᵀ 1D40	≤ 2264	≠ 2260	≥ 2265	˗ 02D7	ᴇ 1D07	→ 2192	⏨ 23E8	↑ 2191	↓ 2193
2x	SP	!	"	#	⁴ 2074	%	&	'	(	)	*	+	,	-	.	/
3x	0	1	2	3	4	5	6	7	8	9	:	;	<	=	>	?
4x	@	A	B	C	D	E	F	G	H	I	J	K	L	M	N	O
5x	P	Q	R	S	T	U	V	W	X	Y	Z	θ 03B8	\	]		_
6x	`	a	b	c	d	e	f	g	h	i	j	k	l	m	n	o
7x	p	q	r	s	t	u	v	w	x	y	z	{	|	}	~	= 003D
8x	₀ 2080	₁ 2081	₂ 2082	₃ 2083	₄ 2084	₅ 2085	₆ 2086	₇ 2087	₈ 2088	₉ 2089	Á 00C1	À 00C0	Â 00C2	Ä 00C4	á 00E1	à 00E0
9x	â 00E2	ä 00E4	É 00C9	È 00C8	Ê 00CA	Ë 00CB	é 00E9	è 00E8	ê 00EA	ë 00EB	Í 00CD	Ì 00CC	Î 00CE	Ï 00CF	í 00ED	ì 00EC
Ax	î 00EE	ï 00EF	Ó 00D3	Ò 00D2	Ô 00D4	Ö 00D6	ó 00F3	ò 00F2	ô 00F4	ö 00F6	Ú 00DA	Ù 00D9	Û 00DB	Ü 00DC	ú 00FA	ù 00F9
Bx	û 00FB	ü 00FC	Ç 00C7	ç 00E7	Ñ 00D1	ñ 00F1	´ 00B4	` 0060	¨ 00A8	¿ 00BF	¡ 00A1	α 03B1	β 03B2	γ 03B3	Δ 0394	δ 03B4
Cx	ε 03B5	[ 005B	λ 03BB	μ 03BC	π 03C0	ρ 03C1	Σ 03A3	σ 03C3	τ 03C4	φ 03C6	Ω 03A9	x̅ 0078 0305	y̅ 0079 0305	˟ 02DF	… 2026	◀ 25C0
Symbols and Punctuation

=== Small font ===
TI-83 Plus character set (small font)
	0	1	2	3	4	5	6	7	8	9	A	B	C	D	E	F
Dx	■ 25A0	∕ 2215	‐ 2010	² 00B2	° 00B0	³ 00B3	LF	𝑖 1D456	P̂ 0050 0302	χ 03C7	𝙵 1D675	𝑒 1D452	ʟ 029F	𝗡 1D5E1	⸩ 2E29	ᴇ 1D07
Ex	LIST; LOCK	SCATTER; 1	SCATTER; 2	XY; LINE 1	XY; LINE 2	BOXPLOT; 1	BOXPLOT; 2	HISTO; GRAM 1	HISTO; GRAM 2	MOD; BOXPLOT 1	MOD; BOXPLOT 2	NORM; PROB; PLOT 1	NORM; PROB; PLOT 2	TWO; SPACES	THREE; SPACES	FIVE; SPACES
Fx	SIX; SPACES	▒ 2592	$ 0024	⬆︎ 2B06	ß 00DF	␣ 2423	/ 2044	⬚ 2B1A	THICK; GRAPH; DOT (Note: Only present on the TI-84+ CSE, the TI-84+ CE, and the TI-83 Premium CE.)	▪ 25AA						
Symbols and Punctuation

=== Large font ===
TI-83 Plus character set (large font)
	0	1	2	3	4	5	6	7	8	9	A	B	C	D	E	F
Dx	■ 25A0	∕ 2215	‐ 2010	² 00B2	° 00B0	³ 00B3	LF	𝑖 1D456	P̂ 0050 0302	χ 03C7	𝙵 1D675	𝑒 1D452	ʟ 029F	𝗡 1D5E1	⸩ 2E29	➧ 27A7
Ex	█ 2588	⇧ 21E7	🅰 1F170	🅰 (Note: Lowercase a in the calculator's font); 1F170	_ 005F	↥ 21A5	A̲ 0041 0332	a̲ 0061 0332	LINE	THICK; LINE	◥ 25E5	◣ 25E3	GRAPH; PATH	GRAPH; ANIMATE	GRAPH; DOT	⬆︎ 2B06
Fx	⬇︎ 2B07	▒ 2592	$ 0024	⬆︎ 2B06	ß 00DF	␣ 2423	/ 2044	⬚ 2B1A	THICK; GRAPH; DOT	▪ 25AA						
Symbols and Punctuation

== TI-86 ==
TI-86 calculators use a character encoding that aligns with the ASCII printable characters, but includes its own characters in place of the C0 control codes and 0x7F, as well as defining its own characters in the 0x80 to 0xFF range (which is not part of ASCII).

TI-86 character set
	0	1	2	3	4	5	6	7	8	9	A	B	C	D	E	F
0x		𝐛 1D41B	𝐨 1D428	𝐝 1D41D	𝐡 1D421	▶ 25B6	⬆ 2B06	⬇ 2B07	∫ 222B	× 00D7	𝐀 1D400	𝐁 1D401	𝐂 1D402	𝐃 1D403	𝐄 1D404	𝐅 1D405
1x	√ 221A	⁻¹; 207B 00B9	² 00B2	∠ 2220	° 00B0	ʳ 02B3	ᵀ 1D40	≤ 2264	≠ 2260	≥ 2265	- 002D	ᴇ 1D07	→ 2192	⏨ 23E8	↑ 2191	↓ 2193
2x	SP	!	"	#	$	%	&	'	(	)	*	+	,	-	.	/
3x	0	1	2	3	4	5	6	7	8	9	:	;	<	=	>	?
4x	@	A	B	C	D	E	F	G	H	I	J	K	L	M	N	O
5x	P	Q	R	S	T	U	V	W	X	Y	Z	[	\	]		_
6x	`	a	b	c	d	e	f	g	h	i	j	k	l	m	n	o
7x	p	q	r	s	t	u	v	w	x	y	z	{	|	}	~	= 003D
8x	₀ 2080	₁ 2081	₂ 2082	₃ 2083	₄ 2084	₅ 2085	₆ 2086	₇ 2087	₈ 2088	₉ 2089	Á 00C1	À 00C0	Â 00C2	Ä 00C4	á 00E1	à 00E0
9x	â 00E2	ä 00E4	É 00C9	È 00C8	Ê 00CA	Ë 00CB	é 00E9	è 00E8	ê 00EA	ë 00EB	Í 00CD	Ì 00CC	Î 00CE	Ï 00CF	í 00ED	ì 00EC
Ax	î 00EE	ï 00EF	Ó 00D3	Ò 00D2	Ô 00D4	Ö 00D6	ó 00F3	ò 00F2	ô 00F4	ö 00F6	Ú 00DA	Ù 00D9	Û 00DB	Ü 00DC	ú 00FA	ù 00F9
Bx	û 00FB	ü 00FC	Ç 00C7	ç 00E7	Ñ 00D1	ñ 00F1	´ 00B4	` 0060	¨ 00A8	¿ 00BF	¡ 00A1	α 03B1	β 03B2	γ 03B3	Δ 0394	δ 03B4
Cx	ε 03B5	θ 03B8	λ 03BB	μ 03BC	π 03C0	ρ 03C1	Σ 03A3	σ 03C3	τ 03C4	φ 03C6	Ω 03A9	x̅ 0078 0305	y̅ 0079 0305	˟ 02DF	… 2026	◀ 25C0
Dx	■ 25A0	∕ 2215	‐ 2010	² 00B2	° 00B0	³ 00B3	LF	➧ 27A7	LINE	THICK; LINE	◥ 25E5	◣ 25E3	ANIM; D LINE	ANIM	⋱ 22F1	█ 2588
Ex	⇧ 21E7	🅰 1F170	🅰 (Note: Lowercase a in the calculator's font); 1F170	_ 005F	↥ 21A5	A̲ 0041 0332	a̲ 0061 0332	▒ 2592	PLOT; SQUARE	PLOT; CROSS	PLOT; DOT	⁴ 2074	﹦ FE66			
Symbols and Punctuation

== TI-89/92 Series ==
The TI-89/92 Series calculators use a character encoding similar to Latin-1, except that most of the control characters are replaced with mathematical symbols or Greek letters. All characters are printable except the null character.

TI-89/92 character set
	0	1	2	3	4	5	6	7	8	9	A	B	C	D	E	F
0x	NUL	␁ 2401	␂ 2402	␃ 2403	␄ 2404	␅ 2405	␆ 2406	🔔︎ 1F514	⌫ 232B	⇥ 21E5	↴ 21B4	⮵ 2BB5	⤒ 2912	↵ 21B5	🔒︎ 1F512	✓ 2713
1x	■ 25A0	◂ 25C2	▸ 25B8	▴ 25B4	▾ 25BE	← 2190	→ 2192	↑ 2191	↓ 2193	◀ 25C0	▶ 25B6	⬆ 2B06	∪ 222A	∩ 2229	⊂ 2282	∈ 2208
2x	SP	!	"	#	$	%	&	'	(	)	*	+	,	-	.	/
3x	0	1	2	3	4	5	6	7	8	9	:	;	<	=	>	?
4x	@	A	B	C	D	E	F	G	H	I	J	K	L	M	N	O
5x	P	Q	R	S	T	U	V	W	X	Y	Z	[	\	]		_
6x	`	a	b	c	d	e	f	g	h	i	j	k	l	m	n	o
7x	p	q	r	s	t	u	v	w	x	y	z	{	|	}	~	◆ 25C6
8x	α 03B1	β 03B2	Γ 0393	γ 03B3	Δ 0394	δ 03B4	ε 03B5	ζ 03B6	θ 03B8	λ 03BB	ξ 03BE	∏ 220F	π 03C0	ρ 03C1	∑ 2211	σ 03C3
9x	τ 03C4	φ 03C6	ψ 03C8	Ω 03A9	ω 03C9	ᴇ 1D07	ℯ 212F	𝐢 1D422	ʳ 02B3	ᵀ 1D40	x̅ 0078 0305	y̅ 0079 0305	≤ 2264	≠ 2260	≥ 2265	∠ 2220
Ax	… 2026	¡	¢	£	¤	¥	¦	§	√ 221A	©	ª	«	¬	⁻ 207B	®	¯
Bx	°	±	²	³	⁻¹; 207B 00B9	µ	¶	·	⁺ 207A	¹	º	»	∂ 2202	∫ 222B	∞ 221E	¿
Cx	À	Á	Â	Ã	Ä	Å	Æ	Ç	È	É	Ê	Ë	Ì	Í	Î	Ï
Dx	Ð	Ñ	Ò	Ó	Ô	Õ	Ö	×	Ø	Ù	Ú	Û	Ü	Ý	Þ	ß
Ex	à	á	â	ã	ä	å	æ	ç	è	é	ê	ë	ì	í	î	ï
Fx	ð	ñ	ò	ó	ô	õ	ö	÷	ø	ù	ú	û	ü	ý	þ	ÿ
Symbols and Punctuation

== See also ==
- Calculator character sets
