= World glyph set =

The World glyph set (also known as WGL or W1G) is a character repertoire comprising a subset of Unicode characters, intended to provide an implementation guideline for font producers for the representation of natural languages. Unlike Windows Glyph List 4 (WGL4), which is specified by an operating system manufacturer, the World glyph set is specified by font foundries. The two lists have very similar, though not identical, glyph coverage; neither is a subset of the other.

Digital fonts for the European and American market have traditionally often been sold in a standard ("Std") package for western languages, with additional separate files to cover central ("CE"), eastern ("Baltic") and southern ("Turk") European languages in the Roman script, and sometimes also packages supporting the Greek (monotonic) and Cyrillic scripts. With the advent of the OpenType format, which supports Unicode, all characters could be included in a single font file. Some font foundries continue to sell packages with differing glyph coverage, where the basic package hardly covers more than Windows-1252. They introduced variants such as Professional ("Pro"), which supports all major languages written in Latin letters; Commercial ("Com"), for international communication in office use, which typically covers the Linotype Extended European Character Set (LEEC); or, adding Greek and Cyrillic, the World glyph set (W1G).

The W1G set is used in several font families by Linotype and Monotype such as Neue Frutiger W1G.

== Character table ==
W1G character table
U+	0	1	2	3	4	5	6	7	8	9	A	B	C	D	E	F
0020		!	"	#	$	%	&	'	(	)	*	+	,	-	.	/
0030	0	1	2	3	4	5	6	7	8	9	:	;	<	=	>	?
0040	@	A	B	C	D	E	F	G	H	I	J	K	L	M	N	O
0050	P	Q	R	S	T	U	V	W	X	Y	Z	[	\	]	^	_
0060	`	a	b	c	d	e	f	g	h	i	j	k	l	m	n	o
0070	p	q	r	s	t	u	v	w	x	y	z	{	|	}	~	
00A0		¡	¢	£	¤	¥	¦	§	¨	©	ª	«	¬	-	®	¯
00B0	°	±	²	³	´	µ	¶	·	¸	¹	º	»	¼	½	¾	¿
00C0	À	Á	Â	Ã	Ä	Å	Æ	Ç	È	É	Ê	Ë	Ì	Í	Î	Ï
00D0	Ð	Ñ	Ò	Ó	Ô	Õ	Ö	×	Ø	Ù	Ú	Û	Ü	Ý	Þ	ß
00E0	à	á	â	ã	ä	å	æ	ç	è	é	ê	ë	ì	í	î	ï
00F0	ð	ñ	ò	ó	ô	õ	ö	÷	ø	ù	ú	û	ü	ý	þ	ÿ
0100	Ā	ā	Ă	ă	Ą	ą	Ć	ć	Ĉ	ĉ	Ċ	ċ	Č	č	Ď	ď
0110	Đ	đ	Ē	ē	Ĕ	ĕ	Ė	ė	Ę	ę	Ě	ě	Ĝ	ĝ	Ğ	ğ
0120	Ġ	ġ	Ģ	ģ	Ĥ	ĥ	Ħ	ħ	Ĩ	ĩ	Ī	ī	Ĭ	ĭ	Į	į
0130	İ	ı	Ĳ	ĳ	Ĵ	ĵ	Ķ	ķ	ĸ	Ĺ	ĺ	Ļ	ļ	Ľ	ľ	Ŀ
0140	ŀ	Ł	ł	Ń	ń	Ņ	ņ	Ň	ň	ŉ	Ŋ	ŋ	Ō	ō	Ŏ	ŏ
0150	Ő	ő	Œ	œ	Ŕ	ŕ	Ŗ	ŗ	Ř	ř	Ś	ś	Ŝ	ŝ	Ş	ş
0160	Š	š	Ţ	ţ	Ť	ť	Ŧ	ŧ	Ũ	ũ	Ū	ū	Ŭ	ŭ	Ů	ů
0170	Ű	ű	Ų	ų	Ŵ	ŵ	Ŷ	ŷ	Ÿ	Ź	ź	Ż	ż	Ž	ž	
0190			ƒ													
01F0											Ǻ	ǻ	Ǽ	ǽ	Ǿ	ǿ
0210									Ș	ș	Ț	ț				
02C0							ˆ	ˇ		ˉ						
02D0									˘	˙	˚	˛	˜	˝		
0370															;	
0380					΄	΅	Ά	·	Έ	Ή	Ί		Ό		Ύ	Ώ
0390	ΐ	Α	Β	Γ	Δ	Ε	Ζ	Η	Θ	Ι	Κ	Λ	Μ	Ν	Ξ	Ο
03A0	Π	Ρ		Σ	Τ	Υ	Φ	Χ	Ψ	Ω	Ϊ	Ϋ	ά	έ	ή	ί
03B0	ΰ	α	β	γ	δ	ε	ζ	η	θ	ι	κ	λ	μ	ν	ξ	ο
03C0	π	ρ	ς	σ	τ	υ	φ	χ	ψ	ω	ϊ	ϋ	ό	ύ	ώ	
0400	Ѐ	Ё	Ђ	Ѓ	Є	Ѕ	І	Ї	Ј	Љ	Њ	Ћ	Ќ	Ѝ	Ў	Џ
0410	А	Б	В	Г	Д	Е	Ж	З	И	Й	К	Л	М	Н	О	П
0420	Р	С	Т	У	Ф	Х	Ц	Ч	Ш	Щ	Ъ	Ы	Ь	Э	Ю	Я
0430	а	б	в	г	д	е	ж	з	и	й	к	л	м	н	о	п
0440	р	с	т	у	ф	х	ц	ч	ш	щ	ъ	ы	ь	э	ю	я
0450	ѐ	ё	ђ	ѓ	є	ѕ	і	ї	ј	љ	њ	ћ	ќ	ѝ	ў	џ
0460			Ѣ	ѣ												
0470			Ѳ	ѳ	Ѵ	ѵ										
0490	Ґ	ґ														
1E80	Ẁ	ẁ	Ẃ	ẃ	Ẅ	ẅ										
1EF0			Ỳ	ỳ												
2010				–	—	―			‘	’	‚	‛	“	”	„	
2020	†	‡	•				…									
2030	‰		′	″						‹	›			‽		
2040					/											
2070	⁰				⁴	⁵	⁶	⁷	⁸	⁹	⁺	⁻	⁼	⁽	⁾	ⁿ
2080	₀	₁	₂	₃	₄	₅	₆	₇	₈	₉	₊	₋	₌	₍	₎	
20A0													€			
2100						℅										
2110				ℓ			№	℗								
2120			™				Ω								℮	
2150												⅛	⅜	⅝	⅞	
2200			∂				∆									∏
2210		∑	−			∕				∙	√				∞	
2220												∫				
2240									≈							
2260	≠				≤	≥										
FB00	ﬀ	ﬁ	ﬂ	ﬃ	ﬄ											

== See also ==
- Adobe Glyph List
- DIN 91379 – Unicode subset for Europe
