= Mac OS Hebrew =

Hebrew character set

Mac OS Hebrew is used in Apple Macintosh computers to represent Hebrew texts.

MacHebrew
| | 0 | 1 | 2 | 3 | 4 | 5 | 6 | 7 | 8 | 9 | A | B | C | D | E | F |
| 2x | SP | ! | " | # | $ | % | & | ' | ( | ) | * | + | , | - | . | / |
| 3x | 0 | 1 | 2 | 3 | 4 | 5 | 6 | 7 | 8 | 9 | : | ; | < | = | > | ? |
| 4x | @ | A | B | C | D | E | F | G | H | I | J | K | L | M | N | O |
| 5x | P | Q | R | S | T | U | V | W | X | Y | Z | [ | \ | ] | | _ |
| 6x | ` | a | b | c | d | e | f | g | h | i | j | k | l | m | n | o |
| 7x | p | q | r | s | t | u | v | w | x | y | z | { | | | } | ~ | DEL |
| 8x | Ä | ײַ | Ç | É | Ñ | Ö | Ü | á | à | â | ä | ã | å | ç | é | è |
| 9x | ê | ë | í | ì | î | ï | ñ | ó | ò | ô | ö | õ | ú | ù | û | ü |
| Ax | SP | ! | " | # | $ | % | ₪ | ' | ) | ( | * | + | , | - | . | / |
| Bx | 0 | 1 | 2 | 3 | 4 | 5 | 6 | 7 | 8 | 9 | : | ; | < | = | > | ? |
| Cx | לֹ | „ |  |  |  |  | ּ | וֹ | וּ | … | | ָ | ַ | ֵ | ֶ | ִ |
| Dx | – | — | “ | ” | ' | ' | שׁ | שׂ | ֿ | ְ | ֲ | ֱ | ֻ | ֹ | ׇ (Note: The addition of U+05C7 to Unicode postdates the creation of Apple's mapping file, which maps this character to the Private Use Area as U+05B8+U+F87F.) | ֳ |
| Ex | א | ב | ג | ד | ה | ו | ז | ח | ט | י | ך | כ | ל | ם | מ | ן |
| Fx | נ | ס | ע | ף | פ | ץ | צ | ק | ר | ש | ת | } | ] | { | [ | | |

Private use characters, tooltip shows Apple's name of the character
Characters which should be treated with strong left-to-right direction
Characters which should be treated with strong right-to-left direction
