= Windows Glyph List 4 =

Pan-European character set specified by Microsoft

Windows Glyph List 4, or more commonly WGL4 for short, also known as the Pan-European character set, is a character repertoire on Microsoft operating systems comprising 657 Unicode characters, two of them for private use. Its purpose is to provide an implementation guideline for producers of fonts for the representation of European natural languages; fonts that provide glyphs for the entire set of characters can claim WGL4 compliance and thus can expect to be compatible with a wide range of software.

As of 2004, WGL4 characters were the only ones guaranteed to display correctly on Microsoft Windows. More recent versions of Windows display far more glyphs.

Because many fonts are designed to fulfill the WGL4 set, this set of characters is likely to work (display as other than replacement glyphs) on many computer systems. For example, all the non-private-use characters in the table below are likely to display properly, compared to the many missing characters that may be seen in other articles about Unicode.

== Repertoire ==
The repertoire, defined by Microsoft, encompasses all the characters found in Windows code pages 1252 (Windows Western), 1250 (Windows Central European), 1251 (Windows Cyrillic), 1253 (Windows Greek), 1254 (Windows Turkish), and 1257 (Windows Baltic). The characters in DOS code page 437 are also all included, but eighteen of them are optional.

It does not cover the combining diacritics used by Vietnamese-related code page 1258, the Thai letters used in code page 874, Hebrew and Arabic letters covered by code pages 1255 and 1256, or the ideographic characters used by code pages 932, 936, 949 and 950.

It also does not cover the Romanian letters Ș, ș, Ț, and ț (U+0218–B), which were added to several of Microsoft's fonts for Windows Vista (long after the WGL4 repertoire was originally defined).

In version 1.5 of the OpenType Specification (May 2008) four Cyrillic characters were added to the WGL4 character set: Ѐ (U+0400), Ѝ (U+040D), ѐ (U+0450) and ѝ (U+045D).

== Character table ==
U+	0	1	2	3	4	5	6	7	8	9	A	B	C	D	E	F	Block
0020		!	"	#	$	%	&	'	(	)	*	+	,	-	.	/	C0 Controls and Basic Latin (identical to ASCII printable characters)
0030	0	1	2	3	4	5	6	7	8	9	:	;	<	=	>	?	C0 Controls and Basic Latin (identical to ASCII printable characters)
0040	@	A	B	C	D	E	F	G	H	I	J	K	L	M	N	O	C0 Controls and Basic Latin (identical to ASCII printable characters)
0050	P	Q	R	S	T	U	V	W	X	Y	Z	[	\	]	^	_	C0 Controls and Basic Latin (identical to ASCII printable characters)
0060	`	a	b	c	d	e	f	g	h	i	j	k	l	m	n	o	C0 Controls and Basic Latin (identical to ASCII printable characters)
0070	p	q	r	s	t	u	v	w	x	y	z	{	|	}	~		C0 Controls and Basic Latin (identical to ASCII printable characters)
																	C1 Controls and Latin-1 Supplement (identical to ISO/IEC 8859-1)
00A0		¡	¢	£	¤	¥	¦	§	¨	©	ª	«	¬	-	®	¯	C1 Controls and Latin-1 Supplement (identical to ISO/IEC 8859-1)
00B0	°	±	²	³	´	µ	¶	·	¸	¹	º	»	¼	½	¾	¿	C1 Controls and Latin-1 Supplement (identical to ISO/IEC 8859-1)
00C0	À	Á	Â	Ã	Ä	Å	Æ	Ç	È	É	Ê	Ë	Ì	Í	Î	Ï	C1 Controls and Latin-1 Supplement (identical to ISO/IEC 8859-1)
00D0	Ð	Ñ	Ò	Ó	Ô	Õ	Ö	×	Ø	Ù	Ú	Û	Ü	Ý	Þ	ß	C1 Controls and Latin-1 Supplement (identical to ISO/IEC 8859-1)
00E0	à	á	â	ã	ä	å	æ	ç	è	é	ê	ë	ì	í	î	ï	C1 Controls and Latin-1 Supplement (identical to ISO/IEC 8859-1)
00F0	ð	ñ	ò	ó	ô	õ	ö	÷	ø	ù	ú	û	ü	ý	þ	ÿ	C1 Controls and Latin-1 Supplement (identical to ISO/IEC 8859-1)
0100	Ā	ā	Ă	ă	Ą	ą	Ć	ć	Ĉ	ĉ	Ċ	ċ	Č	č	Ď	ď	Latin Extended-A
0110	Đ	đ	Ē	ē	Ĕ	ĕ	Ė	ė	Ę	ę	Ě	ě	Ĝ	ĝ	Ğ	ğ	Latin Extended-A
0120	Ġ	ġ	Ģ	ģ	Ĥ	ĥ	Ħ	ħ	Ĩ	ĩ	Ī	ī	Ĭ	ĭ	Į	į	Latin Extended-A
0130	İ	ı	Ĳ	ĳ	Ĵ	ĵ	Ķ	ķ	ĸ	Ĺ	ĺ	Ļ	ļ	Ľ	ľ	Ŀ	Latin Extended-A
0140	ŀ	Ł	ł	Ń	ń	Ņ	ņ	Ň	ň	ŉ	Ŋ	ŋ	Ō	ō	Ŏ	ŏ	Latin Extended-A
0150	Ő	ő	Œ	œ	Ŕ	ŕ	Ŗ	ŗ	Ř	ř	Ś	ś	Ŝ	ŝ	Ş	ş	Latin Extended-A
0160	Š	š	Ţ	ţ	Ť	ť	Ŧ	ŧ	Ũ	ũ	Ū	ū	Ŭ	ŭ	Ů	ů	Latin Extended-A
0170	Ű	ű	Ų	ų	Ŵ	ŵ	Ŷ	ŷ	Ÿ	Ź	ź	Ż	ż	Ž	ž	ſ	Latin Extended-A
																	Latin Extended-B
0190			ƒ														Latin Extended-B
01F0											Ǻ	ǻ	Ǽ	ǽ	Ǿ	ǿ	Latin Extended-B
02C0							ˆ	ˇ		ˉ							Spacing Modifier Letters
02D0									˘	˙	˚	˛	˜	˝			Spacing Modifier Letters
0380					΄	΅	Ά	·	Έ	Ή	Ί		Ό		Ύ	Ώ	Greek
0390	ΐ	Α	Β	Γ	Δ	Ε	Ζ	Η	Θ	Ι	Κ	Λ	Μ	Ν	Ξ	Ο	Greek
03A0	Π	Ρ		Σ	Τ	Υ	Φ	Χ	Ψ	Ω	Ϊ	Ϋ	ά	έ	ή	ί	Greek
03B0	ΰ	α	β	γ	δ	ε	ζ	η	θ	ι	κ	λ	μ	ν	ξ	ο	Greek
03C0	π	ρ	ς	σ	τ	υ	φ	χ	ψ	ω	ϊ	ϋ	ό	ύ	ώ		Greek
0400	Ѐ	Ё	Ђ	Ѓ	Є	Ѕ	І	Ї	Ј	Љ	Њ	Ћ	Ќ	Ѝ	Ў	Џ	Cyrillic
0410	А	Б	В	Г	Д	Е	Ж	З	И	Й	К	Л	М	Н	О	П	Cyrillic
0420	Р	С	Т	У	Ф	Х	Ц	Ч	Ш	Щ	Ъ	Ы	Ь	Э	Ю	Я	Cyrillic
0430	а	б	в	г	д	е	ж	з	и	й	к	л	м	н	о	п	Cyrillic
0440	р	с	т	у	ф	х	ц	ч	ш	щ	ъ	ы	ь	э	ю	я	Cyrillic
0450	ѐ	ё	ђ	ѓ	є	ѕ	і	ї	ј	љ	њ	ћ	ќ	ѝ	ў	џ	Cyrillic
0490	Ґ	ґ															Cyrillic
1E80	Ẁ	ẁ	Ẃ	ẃ	Ẅ	ẅ											Latin Extended Additional
1EF0			Ỳ	ỳ													Latin Extended Additional
2010				–	—	―		‗	‘	’	‚	‛	“	”	„		General Punctuation
2020	†	‡	•				…										General Punctuation
2030	‰		′	″						‹	›		‼		‾		General Punctuation
2040					/												General Punctuation
2070																ⁿ	Super/Subscripts
20A0				₣	₤			₧					€				Currency Symbols
2100						℅											Letterlike symbols
2110				ℓ			№										Letterlike symbols
2120			™				Ω								℮		Letterlike symbols
2150												⅛	⅜	⅝	⅞		Number Forms
2190	←	↑	→	↓	↔	↕											Arrows
21A0									↨								Arrows
2200			∂				∆									∏	Mathematical Operators
2210		∑	−			∕				∙	√				∞	∟	Mathematical Operators
2220										∩		∫					Mathematical Operators
2240									≈								Mathematical Operators
2260	≠	≡			≤	≥											Mathematical Operators
2300			⌂														Miscellaneous Technical
2310	⌐																Miscellaneous Technical
2320	⌠	⌡															Miscellaneous Technical
2500	─		│										┌				Box-drawing characters
2510	┐				└				┘				├				Box-drawing characters
2520					┤								┬				Box-drawing characters
2530					┴								┼				Box-drawing characters
2550	═	║	╒	╓	╔	╕	╖	╗	╘	╙	╚	╛	╜	╝	╞	╟	Box-drawing characters
2560	╠	╡	╢	╣	╤	╥	╦	╧	╨	╩	╪	╫	╬				Box-drawing characters
2580	▀				▄				█				▌				Block Elements
2590	▐	░	▒	▓													Block Elements
25A0	■	□									▪	▫	▬				Geometric Shapes
25B0			▲								►		▼				Geometric Shapes
25C0					◄						◊	○				●	Geometric Shapes
25D0									◘	◙							Geometric Shapes
25E0							◦										Geometric Shapes
																	Miscellaneous Symbols
2630											☺	☻	☼				Miscellaneous Symbols
2640	♀		♂														Miscellaneous Symbols
2660	♠			♣		♥	♦				♪	♫					Miscellaneous Symbols
F000		ﬁ	ﬂ														Private Use Area
FB00		ﬁ	ﬂ														Alphabetic Presentation Forms
U+	0	1	2	3	4	5	6	7	8	9	A	B	C	D	E	F	Block

Legend

not used
optional
private use (F001 and F002 are supposed to be duplicates of ﬁ and ﬂ)
added in OpenType Specification v1.5

== See also ==
- Adobe Glyph List
- World Glyph Set (W1G)
- Multilingual European Subsets MES-1 and MES-2
- DIN 91379 Unicode subset for Europe
- OpenType: WGL4 was an appendix of the OpenType specification until 1.8.4 in November 2020
