= Adobe Glyph List =

Mapping of glyph names to Unicode characters

The Adobe Glyph List (AGL) is a mapping of 4,281 glyph names to one or more Unicode characters. Its purpose is to provide an implementation guideline for consumers of fonts (mainly software applications); it lists a variety of standard names that are given to glyphs that correspond to certain Unicode character sequences. The AGL is maintained by Adobe Systems.

For producers of fonts, Adobe suggests a more limited set of names, the Adobe Glyph List for New Fonts (AGLFN), based on an earlier version of the AGL. Names not in the AGLFN are to be constructed by standard heuristics described in Unicode and Glyph Names.

AGL and AGLFN, along with related resources, are currently maintained and available at the AGL & AGLFN open source project.

== Adobe Latin ==
The Adobe Latin (AL) is a mapping of 1,307 (pre-composed) glyph names. These character sets are informative, not normative, and some have changed since they were first issued. For example, the original version of AL3 did not include the Turkish lira nor the ruble.

- Adobe Latin 1= 229 glyphs, formerly ISO-Adobe
- Adobe Latin 2 = 250 glyphs, formerly Adobe Western 2
- Adobe Latin 3 = 329 glyphs, Adobe Western 2 + CE, the basic western "Pro" font charset
- Adobe Latin 4 = 616 glyphs, Adobe Western 2 + CE + most of WGL-4 + Vietnamese + (a few things)
- Adobe Latin 5 = 1119 glyphs, all the Above + more accented characters + phonetics and transliteration needs

== Adobe Latin Glyph List ==
=== Adobe Latin 1 ===
Table: Adobe Latin 1
Unicode	Character	Glyph name	Character name	SID
0020		space	SPACE	1
0021	!	exclam	EXCLAMATION MARK	2
0022	"	quotedbl	QUOTATION MARK	3
0023	#	numbersign	NUMBER SIGN	4
0024	$	dollar	DOLLAR SIGN	5
0025	%	percent	PERCENT SIGN	6
0026	&	ampersand	AMPERSAND	7
0027	'	quotesingle	APOSTROPHE	104
0028	(	parenleft	LEFT PARENTHESIS	9
0029	)	parenright	RIGHT PARENTHESIS	10
002A	*	asterisk	ASTERISK	11
002B	+	plus	PLUS SIGN	12
002C	,	comma	COMMA	13
002D	-	hyphen	HYPHEN-MINUS	14
002E	.	period	FULL STOP	15
002F	/	slash	SOLIDUS	16
0030	0	zero	DIGIT ZERO	17
0031	1	one	DIGIT ONE	18
0032	2	two	DIGIT TWO	19
0033	3	three	DIGIT THREE	20
0034	4	four	DIGIT FOUR	21
0035	5	five	DIGIT FIVE	22
0036	6	six	DIGIT SIX	23
0037	7	seven	DIGIT SEVEN	24
0038	8	eight	DIGIT EIGHT	25
0039	9	nine	DIGIT NINE	26
003A	:	colon	COLON	27
003B	;	semicolon	SEMICOLON	28
003C	<	less	LESS-THAN SIGN	29
003D	=	equal	EQUALS SIGN	30
003E	>	greater	GREATER-THAN SIGN	31
003F	?	question	QUESTION MARK	32
0040	@	at	COMMERCIAL AT	33
0041	A	A	LATIN CAPITAL LETTER A	34
0042	B	B	LATIN CAPITAL LETTER B	35
0043	C	C	LATIN CAPITAL LETTER C	36
0044	D	D	LATIN CAPITAL LETTER D	37
0045	E	E	LATIN CAPITAL LETTER E	38
0046	F	F	LATIN CAPITAL LETTER F	39
0047	G	G	LATIN CAPITAL LETTER G	40
0048	H	H	LATIN CAPITAL LETTER H	41
0049	I	I	LATIN CAPITAL LETTER I	42
004A	J	J	LATIN CAPITAL LETTER J	43
004B	K	K	LATIN CAPITAL LETTER K	44
004C	L	L	LATIN CAPITAL LETTER L	45
004D	M	M	LATIN CAPITAL LETTER M	46
004E	N	N	LATIN CAPITAL LETTER N	47
004F	O	O	LATIN CAPITAL LETTER O	48
0050	P	P	LATIN CAPITAL LETTER P	49
0051	Q	Q	LATIN CAPITAL LETTER Q	50
0052	R	R	LATIN CAPITAL LETTER R	51
0053	S	S	LATIN CAPITAL LETTER S	52
0054	T	T	LATIN CAPITAL LETTER T	53
0055	U	U	LATIN CAPITAL LETTER U	54
0056	V	V	LATIN CAPITAL LETTER V	55
0057	W	W	LATIN CAPITAL LETTER W	56
0058	X	X	LATIN CAPITAL LETTER X	57
0059	Y	Y	LATIN CAPITAL LETTER Y	58
005A	Z	Z	LATIN CAPITAL LETTER Z	59
005B	[	bracketleft	LEFT SQUARE BRACKET	60
005C	\	backslash	REVERSE SOLIDUS	61
005D	]	bracketright	RIGHT SQUARE BRACKET	62
005E	^	asciicircum	CIRCUMFLEX ACCENT	63
005F	_	underscore	LOW LINE	64
0060	`	grave	GRAVE ACCENT	124
0061	a	a	LATIN SMALL LETTER A	66
0062	b	b	LATIN SMALL LETTER B	67
0063	c	c	LATIN SMALL LETTER C	68
0064	d	d	LATIN SMALL LETTER D	69
0065	e	e	LATIN SMALL LETTER E	70
0066	f	f	LATIN SMALL LETTER F	71
0067	g	g	LATIN SMALL LETTER G	72
0068	h	h	LATIN SMALL LETTER H	73
0069	i	i	LATIN SMALL LETTER I	74
006A	j	j	LATIN SMALL LETTER J	75
006B	k	k	LATIN SMALL LETTER K	76
006C	l	l	LATIN SMALL LETTER L	77
006D	m	m	LATIN SMALL LETTER M	78
006E	n	n	LATIN SMALL LETTER N	79
006F	o	o	LATIN SMALL LETTER O	80
0070	p	p	LATIN SMALL LETTER P	81
0071	q	q	LATIN SMALL LETTER Q	82
0072	r	r	LATIN SMALL LETTER R	83
0073	s	s	LATIN SMALL LETTER S	84
0074	t	t	LATIN SMALL LETTER T	85
0075	u	u	LATIN SMALL LETTER U	86
0076	v	v	LATIN SMALL LETTER V	87
0077	w	w	LATIN SMALL LETTER W	88
0078	x	x	LATIN SMALL LETTER X	89
0079	y	y	LATIN SMALL LETTER Y	90
007A	z	z	LATIN SMALL LETTER Z	91
007B	{	braceleft	LEFT CURLY BRACKET	92
007C	|	bar	VERTICAL LINE	93
007D	}	braceright	RIGHT CURLY BRACKET	94
007E	~	asciitilde	TILDE	95
00A1	¡	exclamdown	INVERTED EXCLAMATION MARK	96
00A2	¢	cent	CENT SIGN	97
00A3	£	sterling	POUND SIGN	98
00A4	¤	currency	CURRENCY SIGN	103
00A5	¥	yen	YEN SIGN	100
00A6	¦	brokenbar	BROKEN BAR	99
00A7	§	section	SECTION SIGN	102
00A8	¨	dieresis	DIAERESIS	131
00A9	©	copyright	COPYRIGHT SIGN	170
00AA	ª	ordfeminine	FEMININE ORDINAL INDICATOR	139
00AB	«	guillemotleft	LEFT-POINTING DOUBLE ANGLE QUOTATION MARK	106
00AC	¬	logicalnot	NOT SIGN	151
00AE	®	registered	REGISTERED SIGN	165
00AF	¯	macron	MACRON	128
00B0	°	degree	DEGREE SIGN	161
00B1	±	plusminus	PLUS-MINUS SIGN	156
00B2	²	twosuperior	SUPERSCRIPT TWO	164
00B3	³	threesuperior	SUPERSCRIPT THREE	169
00B4	´	acute	ACUTE ACCENT	125
00B5	µ	uni00B5	MICRO SIGN	152
00B6	¶	paragraph	PILCROW SIGN	115
00B7	·	periodcentered	MIDDLE DOT	114
00B8	¸	cedilla	CEDILLA	133
00B9	¹	onesuperior	SUPERSCRIPT ONE	150
00BA	º	ordmasculine	MASCULINE ORDINAL INDICATOR	143
00BB	»	guillemotright	RIGHT-POINTING DOUBLE ANGLE QUOTATION MARK	120
00BC	¼	onequarter	VULGAR FRACTION ONE QUARTER	158
00BD	½	onehalf	VULGAR FRACTION ONE HALF	155
00BE	¾	threequarters	VULGAR FRACTION THREE QUARTERS	163
00BF	¿	questiondown	INVERTED QUESTION MARK	123
00C0	À	Agrave	LATIN CAPITAL LETTER A WITH GRAVE	174
00C1	Á	Aacute	LATIN CAPITAL LETTER A WITH ACUTE	171
00C2	Â	Acircumflex	LATIN CAPITAL LETTER A WITH CIRCUMFLEX	172
00C3	Ã	Atilde	LATIN CAPITAL LETTER A WITH TILDE	176
00C4	Ä	Adieresis	LATIN CAPITAL LETTER A WITH DIAERESIS	173
00C5	Å	Aring	LATIN CAPITAL LETTER A WITH RING ABOVE	175
00C6	Æ	AE	LATIN CAPITAL LETTER AE	138
00C7	Ç	Ccedilla	LATIN CAPITAL LETTER C WITH CEDILLA	177
00C8	È	Egrave	LATIN CAPITAL LETTER E WITH GRAVE	181
00C9	É	Eacute	LATIN CAPITAL LETTER E WITH ACUTE	178
00CA	Ê	Ecircumflex	LATIN CAPITAL LETTER E WITH CIRCUMFLEX	179
00CB	Ë	Edieresis	LATIN CAPITAL LETTER E WITH DIAERESIS	180
00CC	Ì	Igrave	LATIN CAPITAL LETTER I WITH GRAVE	185
00CD	Í	Iacute	LATIN CAPITAL LETTER I WITH ACUTE	182
00CE	Î	Icircumflex	LATIN CAPITAL LETTER I WITH CIRCUMFLEX	183
00CF	Ï	Idieresis	LATIN CAPITAL LETTER I WITH DIAERESIS	184
00D0	Ð	Eth	LATIN CAPITAL LETTER ETH	167
00D1	Ñ	Ntilde	LATIN CAPITAL LETTER N WITH TILDE	186
00D2	Ò	Ograve	LATIN CAPITAL LETTER O WITH GRAVE	190
00D3	Ó	Oacute	LATIN CAPITAL LETTER O WITH ACUTE	187
00D4	Ô	Ocircumflex	LATIN CAPITAL LETTER O WITH CIRCUMFLEX	188
00D5	Õ	Otilde	LATIN CAPITAL LETTER O WITH TILDE	191
00D6	Ö	Odieresis	LATIN CAPITAL LETTER O WITH DIAERESIS	189
00D7	×	multiply	MULTIPLICATION SIGN	168
00D8	Ø	Oslash	LATIN CAPITAL LETTER O WITH STROKE	141
00D9	Ù	Ugrave	LATIN CAPITAL LETTER U WITH GRAVE	196
00DA	Ú	Uacute	LATIN CAPITAL LETTER U WITH ACUTE	193
00DB	Û	Ucircumflex	LATIN CAPITAL LETTER U WITH CIRCUMFLEX	194
00DC	Ü	Udieresis	LATIN CAPITAL LETTER U WITH DIAERESIS	195
00DD	Ý	Yacute	LATIN CAPITAL LETTER Y WITH ACUTE	197
00DE	Þ	Thorn	LATIN CAPITAL LETTER THORN	157
00DF	ß	germandbls	LATIN SMALL LETTER SHARP S	149
00E0	à	agrave	LATIN SMALL LETTER A WITH GRAVE	203
00E1	á	aacute	LATIN SMALL LETTER A WITH ACUTE	200
00E2	â	acircumflex	LATIN SMALL LETTER A WITH CIRCUMFLEX	201
00E3	ã	atilde	LATIN SMALL LETTER A WITH TILDE	205
00E4	ä	adieresis	LATIN SMALL LETTER A WITH DIAERESIS	202
00E5	å	aring	LATIN SMALL LETTER A WITH RING ABOVE	204
00E6	æ	ae	LATIN SMALL LETTER AE	144
00E7	ç	ccedilla	LATIN SMALL LETTER C WITH CEDILLA	206
00E8	è	egrave	LATIN SMALL LETTER E WITH GRAVE	210
00E9	é	eacute	LATIN SMALL LETTER E WITH ACUTE	207
00EA	ê	ecircumflex	LATIN SMALL LETTER E WITH CIRCUMFLEX	208
00EB	ë	edieresis	LATIN SMALL LETTER E WITH DIAERESIS	209
00EC	ì	igrave	LATIN SMALL LETTER I WITH GRAVE	214
00ED	í	iacute	LATIN SMALL LETTER I WITH ACUTE	211
00EE	î	icircumflex	LATIN SMALL LETTER I WITH CIRCUMFLEX	212
00EF	ï	idieresis	LATIN SMALL LETTER I WITH DIAERESIS	213
00F0	ð	eth	LATIN SMALL LETTER ETH	167
00F1	ñ	ntilde	LATIN SMALL LETTER N WITH TILDE	215
00F2	ò	ograve	LATIN SMALL LETTER O WITH GRAVE	219
00F3	ó	oacute	LATIN SMALL LETTER O WITH ACUTE	216
00F4	ô	ocircumflex	LATIN SMALL LETTER O WITH CIRCUMFLEX	217
00F5	õ	otilde	LATIN SMALL LETTER O WITH TILDE	220
00F6	ö	odieresis	LATIN SMALL LETTER O WITH DIAERESIS	218
00F7	÷	divide	DIVISION SIGN	159
00F8	ø	oslash	LATIN SMALL LETTER O WITH STROKE	147
00F9	ù	ugrave	LATIN SMALL LETTER U WITH GRAVE	225
00FA	ú	uacute	LATIN SMALL LETTER U WITH ACUTE	222
00FB	û	ucircumflex	LATIN SMALL LETTER U WITH CIRCUMFLEX	223
00FC	ü	udieresis	LATIN SMALL LETTER U WITH DIAERESIS	224
00FD	ý	yacute	LATIN SMALL LETTER Y WITH ACUTE	226
00FE	þ	thorn	LATIN SMALL LETTER THORN	162
00FF	ÿ	ydieresis	LATIN SMALL LETTER Y WITH DIAERESIS	227
0131	ı	dotlessi	LATIN SMALL LETTER DOTLESS I	145
0141	Ł	Lslash	LATIN CAPITAL LETTER L WITH STROKE	140
0142	ł	lslash	LATIN SMALL LETTER L WITH STROKE	146
0152	Œ	OE	LATIN CAPITAL LIGATURE OE	142
0153	œ	oe	LATIN SMALL LIGATURE OE	148
0160	Š	Scaron	LATIN CAPITAL LETTER S WITH CARON	192
0161	š	scaron	LATIN SMALL LETTER S WITH CARON	221
0178	Ÿ	Ydieresis	LATIN CAPITAL LETTER Y WITH DIAERESIS	198
017D	Ž	Zcaron	LATIN CAPITAL LETTER Z WITH CARON	199
017E	ž	zcaron	LATIN SMALL LETTER Z WITH CARON	228
0192	ƒ	florin	LATIN SMALL LETTER F WITH HOOK	101
02C6	ˆ	circumflex	MODIFIER LETTER CIRCUMFLEX ACCENT	126
02C7	ˇ	caron	CARON	136
02D8	˘	breve	BREVE	129
02D9	˙	dotaccent	DOT ABOVE	130
02DA	˚	ring	RING ABOVE	132
02DB	˛	ogonek	OGONEK	135
02DC	˜	tilde	SMALL TILDE	127
02DD	˝	hungarumlaut	DOUBLE ACUTE ACCENT	134
2013	–	endash	EN DASH	111
2014	—	emdash	EM DASH	137
2018	‘	quoteleft	LEFT SINGLE QUOTATION MARK	65
2019	’	quoteright	RIGHT SINGLE QUOTATION MARK	8
201A	‚	quotesinglbase	SINGLE LOW-9 QUOTATION MARK	117
201C	“	quotedblleft	LEFT DOUBLE QUOTATION MARK	105
201D	”	quotedblright	RIGHT DOUBLE QUOTATION MARK	119
201E	„	quotedblbase	DOUBLE LOW-9 QUOTATION MARK	118
2020	†	dagger	DAGGER	112
2021	‡	daggerdbl	DOUBLE DAGGER	113
2022	•	bullet	BULLET	116
2026	…	ellipsis	HORIZONTAL ELLIPSIS	121
2030	‰	perthousand	PER MILLE SIGN	122
2039	‹	guilsinglleft	SINGLE LEFT-POINTING ANGLE QUOTATION MARK	107
203A	›	guilsinglright	SINGLE RIGHT-POINTING ANGLE QUOTATION MARK	108
2044	/	fraction	FRACTION SLASH	99
20AC	€	Euro	EURO SIGN	
2122	™	trademark	TRADE MARK SIGN	153
2212	−	minus	MINUS SIGN	156
FB01	ﬁ	fi	LATIN SMALL LIGATURE FI	109
FB02	ﬂ	fl	LATIN SMALL LIGATURE FL	110

=== Adobe Latin 2 ===
Table: Adobe Latin 2
Unicode	Character	Glyph name	Character name	Added
0020		space	SPACE	
0021	!	exclam	EXCLAMATION MARK	
0022	"	quotedbl	QUOTATION MARK	
0023	#	numbersign	NUMBER SIGN	
0024	$	dollar	DOLLAR SIGN	
0025	%	percent	PERCENT SIGN	
0026	&	ampersand	AMPERSAND	
0027	'	quotesingle	APOSTROPHE	
0028	(	parenleft	LEFT PARENTHESIS	
0029	)	parenright	RIGHT PARENTHESIS	
002A	*	asterisk	ASTERISK	
002B	+	plus	PLUS SIGN	
002C	,	comma	COMMA	
002D	-	hyphen	HYPHEN-MINUS	
002E	.	period	FULL STOP	
002F	/	slash	SOLIDUS	
0030	0	zero	DIGIT ZERO	
0031	1	one	DIGIT ONE	
0032	2	two	DIGIT TWO	
0033	3	three	DIGIT THREE	
0034	4	four	DIGIT FOUR	
0035	5	five	DIGIT FIVE	
0036	6	six	DIGIT SIX	
0037	7	seven	DIGIT SEVEN	
0038	8	eight	DIGIT EIGHT	
0039	9	nine	DIGIT NINE	
003A	:	colon	COLON	
003B	;	semicolon	SEMICOLON	
003C	<	less	LESS-THAN SIGN	
003D	=	equal	EQUALS SIGN	
003E	>	greater	GREATER-THAN SIGN	
003F	?	question	QUESTION MARK	
0040	@	at	COMMERCIAL AT	
0041	A	A	LATIN CAPITAL LETTER A	
0042	B	B	LATIN CAPITAL LETTER B	
0043	C	C	LATIN CAPITAL LETTER C	
0044	D	D	LATIN CAPITAL LETTER D	
0045	E	E	LATIN CAPITAL LETTER E	
0046	F	F	LATIN CAPITAL LETTER F	
0047	G	G	LATIN CAPITAL LETTER G	
0048	H	H	LATIN CAPITAL LETTER H	
0049	I	I	LATIN CAPITAL LETTER I	
004A	J	J	LATIN CAPITAL LETTER J	
004B	K	K	LATIN CAPITAL LETTER K	
004C	L	L	LATIN CAPITAL LETTER L	
004D	M	M	LATIN CAPITAL LETTER M	
004E	N	N	LATIN CAPITAL LETTER N	
004F	O	O	LATIN CAPITAL LETTER O	
0050	P	P	LATIN CAPITAL LETTER P	
0051	Q	Q	LATIN CAPITAL LETTER Q	
0052	R	R	LATIN CAPITAL LETTER R	
0053	S	S	LATIN CAPITAL LETTER S	
0054	T	T	LATIN CAPITAL LETTER T	
0055	U	U	LATIN CAPITAL LETTER U	
0056	V	V	LATIN CAPITAL LETTER V	
0057	W	W	LATIN CAPITAL LETTER W	
0058	X	X	LATIN CAPITAL LETTER X	
0059	Y	Y	LATIN CAPITAL LETTER Y	
005A	Z	Z	LATIN CAPITAL LETTER Z	
005B	[	bracketleft	LEFT SQUARE BRACKET	
005C	\	backslash	REVERSE SOLIDUS	
005D	]	bracketright	RIGHT SQUARE BRACKET	
005E	^	asciicircum	CIRCUMFLEX ACCENT	
005F	_	underscore	LOW LINE	
0060	`	grave	GRAVE ACCENT	
0061	a	a	LATIN SMALL LETTER A	
0062	b	b	LATIN SMALL LETTER B	
0063	c	c	LATIN SMALL LETTER C	
0064	d	d	LATIN SMALL LETTER D	
0065	e	e	LATIN SMALL LETTER E	
0066	f	f	LATIN SMALL LETTER F	
0067	g	g	LATIN SMALL LETTER G	
0068	h	h	LATIN SMALL LETTER H	
0069	i	i	LATIN SMALL LETTER I	
006A	j	j	LATIN SMALL LETTER J	
006B	k	k	LATIN SMALL LETTER K	
006C	l	l	LATIN SMALL LETTER L	
006D	m	m	LATIN SMALL LETTER M	
006E	n	n	LATIN SMALL LETTER N	
006F	o	o	LATIN SMALL LETTER O	
0070	p	p	LATIN SMALL LETTER P	
0071	q	q	LATIN SMALL LETTER Q	
0072	r	r	LATIN SMALL LETTER R	
0073	s	s	LATIN SMALL LETTER S	
0074	t	t	LATIN SMALL LETTER T	
0075	u	u	LATIN SMALL LETTER U	
0076	v	v	LATIN SMALL LETTER V	
0077	w	w	LATIN SMALL LETTER W	
0078	x	x	LATIN SMALL LETTER X	
0079	y	y	LATIN SMALL LETTER Y	
007A	z	z	LATIN SMALL LETTER Z	
007B	{	braceleft	LEFT CURLY BRACKET	
007C	|	bar	VERTICAL LINE	
007D	}	braceright	RIGHT CURLY BRACKET	
007E	~	asciitilde	TILDE	
00A0		uni00A0	NO-BREAK SPACE	•
00A1	¡	exclamdown	INVERTED EXCLAMATION MARK	
00A2	¢	cent	CENT SIGN	
00A3	£	sterling	POUND SIGN	
00A4	¤	currency	CURRENCY SIGN	
00A5	¥	yen	YEN SIGN	
00A6	¦	brokenbar	BROKEN BAR	
00A7	§	section	SECTION SIGN	
00A8	¨	dieresis	DIAERESIS	
00A9	©	copyright	COPYRIGHT SIGN	
00AA	ª	ordfeminine	FEMININE ORDINAL INDICATOR	
00AB	«	guillemotleft	LEFT-POINTING DOUBLE ANGLE QUOTATION MARK	
00AC	¬	logicalnot	NOT SIGN	
00AD		uni00AD	SOFT HYPHEN	•
00AE	®	registered	REGISTERED SIGN	
00AF	¯	macron	MACRON	
00B0	°	degree	DEGREE SIGN	
00B1	±	plusminus	PLUS-MINUS SIGN	
00B2	²	twosuperior	SUPERSCRIPT TWO	
00B3	³	threesuperior	SUPERSCRIPT THREE	
00B4	´	acute	ACUTE ACCENT	
00B5	µ	uni00B5	MICRO SIGN	
00B6	¶	paragraph	PILCROW SIGN	
00B7	·	periodcentered	MIDDLE DOT	
00B8	¸	cedilla	CEDILLA	
00B9	¹	onesuperior	SUPERSCRIPT ONE	
00BA	º	ordmasculine	MASCULINE ORDINAL INDICATOR	
00BB	»	guillemotright	RIGHT-POINTING DOUBLE ANGLE QUOTATION MARK	
00BC	¼	onequarter	VULGAR FRACTION ONE QUARTER	
00BD	½	onehalf	VULGAR FRACTION ONE HALF	
00BE	¾	threequarters	VULGAR FRACTION THREE QUARTERS	
00BF	¿	questiondown	INVERTED QUESTION MARK	
00C0	À	Agrave	LATIN CAPITAL LETTER A WITH GRAVE	
00C1	Á	Aacute	LATIN CAPITAL LETTER A WITH ACUTE	
00C2	Â	Acircumflex	LATIN CAPITAL LETTER A WITH CIRCUMFLEX	
00C3	Ã	Atilde	LATIN CAPITAL LETTER A WITH TILDE	
00C4	Ä	Adieresis	LATIN CAPITAL LETTER A WITH DIAERESIS	
00C5	Å	Aring	LATIN CAPITAL LETTER A WITH RING ABOVE	
00C6	Æ	AE	LATIN CAPITAL LETTER AE	
00C7	Ç	Ccedilla	LATIN CAPITAL LETTER C WITH CEDILLA	
00C8	È	Egrave	LATIN CAPITAL LETTER E WITH GRAVE	
00C9	É	Eacute	LATIN CAPITAL LETTER E WITH ACUTE	
00CA	Ê	Ecircumflex	LATIN CAPITAL LETTER E WITH CIRCUMFLEX	
00CB	Ë	Edieresis	LATIN CAPITAL LETTER E WITH DIAERESIS	
00CC	Ì	Igrave	LATIN CAPITAL LETTER I WITH GRAVE	
00CD	Í	Iacute	LATIN CAPITAL LETTER I WITH ACUTE	
00CE	Î	Icircumflex	LATIN CAPITAL LETTER I WITH CIRCUMFLEX	
00CF	Ï	Idieresis	LATIN CAPITAL LETTER I WITH DIAERESIS	
00D0	Ð	Eth	LATIN CAPITAL LETTER ETH	
00D1	Ñ	Ntilde	LATIN CAPITAL LETTER N WITH TILDE	
00D2	Ò	Ograve	LATIN CAPITAL LETTER O WITH GRAVE	
00D3	Ó	Oacute	LATIN CAPITAL LETTER O WITH ACUTE	
00D4	Ô	Ocircumflex	LATIN CAPITAL LETTER O WITH CIRCUMFLEX	
00D5	Õ	Otilde	LATIN CAPITAL LETTER O WITH TILDE	
00D6	Ö	Odieresis	LATIN CAPITAL LETTER O WITH DIAERESIS	
00D7	×	multiply	MULTIPLICATION SIGN	
00D8	Ø	Oslash	LATIN CAPITAL LETTER O WITH STROKE	
00D9	Ù	Ugrave	LATIN CAPITAL LETTER U WITH GRAVE	
00DA	Ú	Uacute	LATIN CAPITAL LETTER U WITH ACUTE	
00DB	Û	Ucircumflex	LATIN CAPITAL LETTER U WITH CIRCUMFLEX	
00DC	Ü	Udieresis	LATIN CAPITAL LETTER U WITH DIAERESIS	
00DD	Ý	Yacute	LATIN CAPITAL LETTER Y WITH ACUTE	
00DE	Þ	Thorn	LATIN CAPITAL LETTER THORN	
00DF	ß	germandbls	LATIN SMALL LETTER SHARP S	
00E0	à	agrave	LATIN SMALL LETTER A WITH GRAVE	
00E1	á	aacute	LATIN SMALL LETTER A WITH ACUTE	
00E2	â	acircumflex	LATIN SMALL LETTER A WITH CIRCUMFLEX	
00E3	ã	atilde	LATIN SMALL LETTER A WITH TILDE	
00E4	ä	adieresis	LATIN SMALL LETTER A WITH DIAERESIS	
00E5	å	aring	LATIN SMALL LETTER A WITH RING ABOVE	
00E6	æ	ae	LATIN SMALL LETTER AE	
00E7	ç	ccedilla	LATIN SMALL LETTER C WITH CEDILLA	
00E8	è	egrave	LATIN SMALL LETTER E WITH GRAVE	
00E9	é	eacute	LATIN SMALL LETTER E WITH ACUTE	
00EA	ê	ecircumflex	LATIN SMALL LETTER E WITH CIRCUMFLEX	
00EB	ë	edieresis	LATIN SMALL LETTER E WITH DIAERESIS	
00EC	ì	igrave	LATIN SMALL LETTER I WITH GRAVE	
00ED	í	iacute	LATIN SMALL LETTER I WITH ACUTE	
00EE	î	icircumflex	LATIN SMALL LETTER I WITH CIRCUMFLEX	
00EF	ï	idieresis	LATIN SMALL LETTER I WITH DIAERESIS	
00F0	ð	eth	LATIN SMALL LETTER ETH	
00F1	ñ	ntilde	LATIN SMALL LETTER N WITH TILDE	
00F2	ò	ograve	LATIN SMALL LETTER O WITH GRAVE	
00F3	ó	oacute	LATIN SMALL LETTER O WITH ACUTE	
00F4	ô	ocircumflex	LATIN SMALL LETTER O WITH CIRCUMFLEX	
00F5	õ	otilde	LATIN SMALL LETTER O WITH TILDE	
00F6	ö	odieresis	LATIN SMALL LETTER O WITH DIAERESIS	
00F7	÷	divide	DIVISION SIGN	
00F8	ø	oslash	LATIN SMALL LETTER O WITH STROKE	
00F9	ù	ugrave	LATIN SMALL LETTER U WITH GRAVE	
00FA	ú	uacute	LATIN SMALL LETTER U WITH ACUTE	
00FB	û	ucircumflex	LATIN SMALL LETTER U WITH CIRCUMFLEX	
00FC	ü	udieresis	LATIN SMALL LETTER U WITH DIAERESIS	
00FD	ý	yacute	LATIN SMALL LETTER Y WITH ACUTE	
00FE	þ	thorn	LATIN SMALL LETTER THORN	
00FF	ÿ	ydieresis	LATIN SMALL LETTER Y WITH DIAERESIS	
0131	ı	dotlessi	LATIN SMALL LETTER DOTLESS I	
0141	Ł	Lslash	LATIN CAPITAL LETTER L WITH STROKE	
0142	ł	lslash	LATIN SMALL LETTER L WITH STROKE	
0152	Œ	OE	LATIN CAPITAL LIGATURE OE	
0153	œ	oe	LATIN SMALL LIGATURE OE	
0160	Š	Scaron	LATIN CAPITAL LETTER S WITH CARON	
0161	š	scaron	LATIN SMALL LETTER S WITH CARON	
0178	Ÿ	Ydieresis	LATIN CAPITAL LETTER Y WITH DIAERESIS	
017D	Ž	Zcaron	LATIN CAPITAL LETTER Z WITH CARON	
017E	ž	zcaron	LATIN SMALL LETTER Z WITH CARON	
0192	ƒ	florin	LATIN SMALL LETTER F WITH HOOK	
02C6	ˆ	circumflex	MODIFIER LETTER CIRCUMFLEX ACCENT	
02C7	ˇ	caron	CARON	
02C9	ˉ	uni02C9	MODIFIER LETTER MACRON	•
02D8	˘	breve	BREVE	
02D9	˙	dotaccent	DOT ABOVE	
02DA	˚	ring	RING ABOVE	
02DB	˛	ogonek	OGONEK	
02DC	˜	tilde	SMALL TILDE	
02DD	˝	hungarumlaut	DOUBLE ACUTE ACCENT	
03C0	π	pi	GREEK SMALL LETTER PI	•
2013	–	endash	EN DASH	
2014	—	emdash	EM DASH	
2018	‘	quoteleft	LEFT SINGLE QUOTATION MARK	
2019	’	quoteright	RIGHT SINGLE QUOTATION MARK	
201A	‚	quotesinglbase	SINGLE LOW-9 QUOTATION MARK	
201C	“	quotedblleft	LEFT DOUBLE QUOTATION MARK	
201D	”	quotedblright	RIGHT DOUBLE QUOTATION MARK	
201E	„	quotedblbase	DOUBLE LOW-9 QUOTATION MARK	
2020	†	dagger	DAGGER	
2021	‡	daggerdbl	DOUBLE DAGGER	
2022	•	bullet	BULLET	
2026	…	ellipsis	HORIZONTAL ELLIPSIS	
2030	‰	perthousand	PER MILLE SIGN	
2039	‹	guilsinglleft	SINGLE LEFT-POINTING ANGLE QUOTATION MARK	
203A	›	guilsinglright	SINGLE RIGHT-POINTING ANGLE QUOTATION MARK	
2044	/	fraction	FRACTION SLASH	
20AC	€	Euro	EURO SIGN	
2113	ℓ	uni2113	SCRIPT SMALL L	•
2122	™	trademark	TRADE MARK SIGN	
2126	Ω	uni2126	OHM SIGN	•
212E	℮	estimated	ESTIMATED SYMBOL	•
2202	∂	partialdiff	PARTIAL DIFFERENTIAL	•
2206	∆	uni2206	INCREMENT	•
220F	∏	product	N-ARY PRODUCT	•
2211	∑	summation	N-ARY SUMMATION	•
2212	−	minus	MINUS SIGN	
2215	∕	uni2215	DIVISION SLASH	•
2219	∙	uni2219	BULLET OPERATOR	•
221A	√	radical	SQUARE ROOT	•
221E	∞	infinity	INFINITY	•
222B	∫	integral	INTEGRAL	•
2248	≈	approxequal	ALMOST EQUAL TO	•
2260	≠	notequal	NOT EQUAL TO	•
2264	≤	lessequal	LESS-THAN OR EQUAL TO	•
2265	≥	greaterequal	GREATER-THAN OR EQUAL TO	•
25CA	◊	lozenge	LOZENGE	•
FB01	ﬁ	fi	LATIN SMALL LIGATURE FI	
FB02	ﬂ	fl	LATIN SMALL LIGATURE FL	

=== Adobe Latin 3 ===
Table: Adobe Latin 3
Unicode	Character	Glyph name	Character name	Added
0020		space	SPACE	
0021	!	exclam	EXCLAMATION MARK	
0022	"	quotedbl	QUOTATION MARK	
0023	#	numbersign	NUMBER SIGN	
0024	$	dollar	DOLLAR SIGN	
0025	%	percent	PERCENT SIGN	
0026	&	ampersand	AMPERSAND	
0027	'	quotesingle	APOSTROPHE	
0028	(	parenleft	LEFT PARENTHESIS	
0029	)	parenright	RIGHT PARENTHESIS	
002A	*	asterisk	ASTERISK	
002B	+	plus	PLUS SIGN	
002C	,	comma	COMMA	
002D	-	hyphen	HYPHEN-MINUS	
002E	.	period	FULL STOP	
002F	/	slash	SOLIDUS	
0030	0	zero	DIGIT ZERO	
0031	1	one	DIGIT ONE	
0032	2	two	DIGIT TWO	
0033	3	three	DIGIT THREE	
0034	4	four	DIGIT FOUR	
0035	5	five	DIGIT FIVE	
0036	6	six	DIGIT SIX	
0037	7	seven	DIGIT SEVEN	
0038	8	eight	DIGIT EIGHT	
0039	9	nine	DIGIT NINE	
003A	:	colon	COLON	
003B	;	semicolon	SEMICOLON	
003C	<	less	LESS-THAN SIGN	
003D	=	equal	EQUALS SIGN	
003E	>	greater	GREATER-THAN SIGN	
003F	?	question	QUESTION MARK	
0040	@	at	COMMERCIAL AT	
0041	A	A	LATIN CAPITAL LETTER A	
0042	B	B	LATIN CAPITAL LETTER B	
0043	C	C	LATIN CAPITAL LETTER C	
0044	D	D	LATIN CAPITAL LETTER D	
0045	E	E	LATIN CAPITAL LETTER E	
0046	F	F	LATIN CAPITAL LETTER F	
0047	G	G	LATIN CAPITAL LETTER G	
0048	H	H	LATIN CAPITAL LETTER H	
0049	I	I	LATIN CAPITAL LETTER I	
004A	J	J	LATIN CAPITAL LETTER J	
004B	K	K	LATIN CAPITAL LETTER K	
004C	L	L	LATIN CAPITAL LETTER L	
004D	M	M	LATIN CAPITAL LETTER M	
004E	N	N	LATIN CAPITAL LETTER N	
004F	O	O	LATIN CAPITAL LETTER O	
0050	P	P	LATIN CAPITAL LETTER P	
0051	Q	Q	LATIN CAPITAL LETTER Q	
0052	R	R	LATIN CAPITAL LETTER R	
0053	S	S	LATIN CAPITAL LETTER S	
0054	T	T	LATIN CAPITAL LETTER T	
0055	U	U	LATIN CAPITAL LETTER U	
0056	V	V	LATIN CAPITAL LETTER V	
0057	W	W	LATIN CAPITAL LETTER W	
0058	X	X	LATIN CAPITAL LETTER X	
0059	Y	Y	LATIN CAPITAL LETTER Y	
005A	Z	Z	LATIN CAPITAL LETTER Z	
005B	[	bracketleft	LEFT SQUARE BRACKET	
005C	\	backslash	REVERSE SOLIDUS	
005D	]	bracketright	RIGHT SQUARE BRACKET	
005E	^	asciicircum	CIRCUMFLEX ACCENT	
005F	_	underscore	LOW LINE	
0060	`	grave	GRAVE ACCENT	
0061	a	a	LATIN SMALL LETTER A	
0062	b	b	LATIN SMALL LETTER B	
0063	c	c	LATIN SMALL LETTER C	
0064	d	d	LATIN SMALL LETTER D	
0065	e	e	LATIN SMALL LETTER E	
0066	f	f	LATIN SMALL LETTER F	
0067	g	g	LATIN SMALL LETTER G	
0068	h	h	LATIN SMALL LETTER H	
0069	i	i	LATIN SMALL LETTER I	
006A	j	j	LATIN SMALL LETTER J	
006B	k	k	LATIN SMALL LETTER K	
006C	l	l	LATIN SMALL LETTER L	
006D	m	m	LATIN SMALL LETTER M	
006E	n	n	LATIN SMALL LETTER N	
006F	o	o	LATIN SMALL LETTER O	
0070	p	p	LATIN SMALL LETTER P	
0071	q	q	LATIN SMALL LETTER Q	
0072	r	r	LATIN SMALL LETTER R	
0073	s	s	LATIN SMALL LETTER S	
0074	t	t	LATIN SMALL LETTER T	
0075	u	u	LATIN SMALL LETTER U	
0076	v	v	LATIN SMALL LETTER V	
0077	w	w	LATIN SMALL LETTER W	
0078	x	x	LATIN SMALL LETTER X	
0079	y	y	LATIN SMALL LETTER Y	
007A	z	z	LATIN SMALL LETTER Z	
007B	{	braceleft	LEFT CURLY BRACKET	
007C	|	bar	VERTICAL LINE	
007D	}	braceright	RIGHT CURLY BRACKET	
007E	~	asciitilde	TILDE	
00A0		uni00A0	NO-BREAK SPACE	
00A1	¡	exclamdown	INVERTED EXCLAMATION MARK	
00A2	¢	cent	CENT SIGN	
00A3	£	sterling	POUND SIGN	
00A4	¤	currency	CURRENCY SIGN	
00A5	¥	yen	YEN SIGN	
00A6	¦	brokenbar	BROKEN BAR	
00A7	§	section	SECTION SIGN	
00A8	¨	dieresis	DIAERESIS	
00A9	©	copyright	COPYRIGHT SIGN	
00AA	ª	ordfeminine	FEMININE ORDINAL INDICATOR	
00AB	«	guillemotleft	LEFT-POINTING DOUBLE ANGLE QUOTATION MARK	
00AC	¬	logicalnot	NOT SIGN	
00AD		uni00AD	SOFT HYPHEN	
00AE	®	registered	REGISTERED SIGN	
00AF	¯	macron	MACRON	
00B0	°	degree	DEGREE SIGN	
00B1	±	plusminus	PLUS-MINUS SIGN	
00B2	²	twosuperior	SUPERSCRIPT TWO	
00B3	³	threesuperior	SUPERSCRIPT THREE	
00B4	´	acute	ACUTE ACCENT	
00B5	µ	uni00B5	MICRO SIGN	
00B6	¶	paragraph	PILCROW SIGN	
00B7	·	periodcentered	MIDDLE DOT	
00B8	¸	cedilla	CEDILLA	
00B9	¹	onesuperior	SUPERSCRIPT ONE	
00BA	º	ordmasculine	MASCULINE ORDINAL INDICATOR	
00BB	»	guillemotright	RIGHT-POINTING DOUBLE ANGLE QUOTATION MARK	
00BC	¼	onequarter	VULGAR FRACTION ONE QUARTER	
00BD	½	onehalf	VULGAR FRACTION ONE HALF	
00BE	¾	threequarters	VULGAR FRACTION THREE QUARTERS	
00BF	¿	questiondown	INVERTED QUESTION MARK	
00C0	À	Agrave	LATIN CAPITAL LETTER A WITH GRAVE	
00C1	Á	Aacute	LATIN CAPITAL LETTER A WITH ACUTE	
00C2	Â	Acircumflex	LATIN CAPITAL LETTER A WITH CIRCUMFLEX	
00C3	Ã	Atilde	LATIN CAPITAL LETTER A WITH TILDE	
00C4	Ä	Adieresis	LATIN CAPITAL LETTER A WITH DIAERESIS	
00C5	Å	Aring	LATIN CAPITAL LETTER A WITH RING ABOVE	
00C6	Æ	AE	LATIN CAPITAL LETTER AE	
00C7	Ç	Ccedilla	LATIN CAPITAL LETTER C WITH CEDILLA	
00C8	È	Egrave	LATIN CAPITAL LETTER E WITH GRAVE	
00C9	É	Eacute	LATIN CAPITAL LETTER E WITH ACUTE	
00CA	Ê	Ecircumflex	LATIN CAPITAL LETTER E WITH CIRCUMFLEX	
00CB	Ë	Edieresis	LATIN CAPITAL LETTER E WITH DIAERESIS	
00CC	Ì	Igrave	LATIN CAPITAL LETTER I WITH GRAVE	
00CD	Í	Iacute	LATIN CAPITAL LETTER I WITH ACUTE	
00CE	Î	Icircumflex	LATIN CAPITAL LETTER I WITH CIRCUMFLEX	
00CF	Ï	Idieresis	LATIN CAPITAL LETTER I WITH DIAERESIS	
00D0	Ð	Eth	LATIN CAPITAL LETTER ETH	
00D1	Ñ	Ntilde	LATIN CAPITAL LETTER N WITH TILDE	
00D2	Ò	Ograve	LATIN CAPITAL LETTER O WITH GRAVE	
00D3	Ó	Oacute	LATIN CAPITAL LETTER O WITH ACUTE	
00D4	Ô	Ocircumflex	LATIN CAPITAL LETTER O WITH CIRCUMFLEX	
00D5	Õ	Otilde	LATIN CAPITAL LETTER O WITH TILDE	
00D6	Ö	Odieresis	LATIN CAPITAL LETTER O WITH DIAERESIS	
00D7	×	multiply	MULTIPLICATION SIGN	
00D8	Ø	Oslash	LATIN CAPITAL LETTER O WITH STROKE	
00D9	Ù	Ugrave	LATIN CAPITAL LETTER U WITH GRAVE	
00DA	Ú	Uacute	LATIN CAPITAL LETTER U WITH ACUTE	
00DB	Û	Ucircumflex	LATIN CAPITAL LETTER U WITH CIRCUMFLEX	
00DC	Ü	Udieresis	LATIN CAPITAL LETTER U WITH DIAERESIS	
00DD	Ý	Yacute	LATIN CAPITAL LETTER Y WITH ACUTE	
00DE	Þ	Thorn	LATIN CAPITAL LETTER THORN	
00DF	ß	germandbls	LATIN SMALL LETTER SHARP S	
00E0	à	agrave	LATIN SMALL LETTER A WITH GRAVE	
00E1	á	aacute	LATIN SMALL LETTER A WITH ACUTE	
00E2	â	acircumflex	LATIN SMALL LETTER A WITH CIRCUMFLEX	
00E3	ã	atilde	LATIN SMALL LETTER A WITH TILDE	
00E4	ä	adieresis	LATIN SMALL LETTER A WITH DIAERESIS	
00E5	å	aring	LATIN SMALL LETTER A WITH RING ABOVE	
00E6	æ	ae	LATIN SMALL LETTER AE	
00E7	ç	ccedilla	LATIN SMALL LETTER C WITH CEDILLA	
00E8	è	egrave	LATIN SMALL LETTER E WITH GRAVE	
00E9	é	eacute	LATIN SMALL LETTER E WITH ACUTE	
00EA	ê	ecircumflex	LATIN SMALL LETTER E WITH CIRCUMFLEX	
00EB	ë	edieresis	LATIN SMALL LETTER E WITH DIAERESIS	
00EC	ì	igrave	LATIN SMALL LETTER I WITH GRAVE	
00ED	í	iacute	LATIN SMALL LETTER I WITH ACUTE	
00EE	î	icircumflex	LATIN SMALL LETTER I WITH CIRCUMFLEX	
00EF	ï	idieresis	LATIN SMALL LETTER I WITH DIAERESIS	
00F0	ð	eth	LATIN SMALL LETTER ETH	
00F1	ñ	ntilde	LATIN SMALL LETTER N WITH TILDE	
00F2	ò	ograve	LATIN SMALL LETTER O WITH GRAVE	
00F3	ó	oacute	LATIN SMALL LETTER O WITH ACUTE	
00F4	ô	ocircumflex	LATIN SMALL LETTER O WITH CIRCUMFLEX	
00F5	õ	otilde	LATIN SMALL LETTER O WITH TILDE	
00F6	ö	odieresis	LATIN SMALL LETTER O WITH DIAERESIS	
00F7	÷	divide	DIVISION SIGN	
00F8	ø	oslash	LATIN SMALL LETTER O WITH STROKE	
00F9	ù	ugrave	LATIN SMALL LETTER U WITH GRAVE	
00FA	ú	uacute	LATIN SMALL LETTER U WITH ACUTE	
00FB	û	ucircumflex	LATIN SMALL LETTER U WITH CIRCUMFLEX	
00FC	ü	udieresis	LATIN SMALL LETTER U WITH DIAERESIS	
00FD	ý	yacute	LATIN SMALL LETTER Y WITH ACUTE	
00FE	þ	thorn	LATIN SMALL LETTER THORN	
00FF	ÿ	ydieresis	LATIN SMALL LETTER Y WITH DIAERESIS	
0100	Ā	Amacron	LATIN CAPITAL LETTER A WITH MACRON	•
0101	ā	amacron	LATIN SMALL LETTER A WITH MACRON	•
0102	Ă	Abreve	LATIN CAPITAL LETTER A WITH BREVE	•
0103	ă	abreve	LATIN SMALL LETTER A WITH BREVE	•
0104	Ą	Aogonek	LATIN CAPITAL LETTER A WITH OGONEK	•
0105	ą	aogonek	LATIN SMALL LETTER A WITH OGONEK	•
0106	Ć	Cacute	LATIN CAPITAL LETTER C WITH ACUTE	•
0107	ć	cacute	LATIN SMALL LETTER C WITH ACUTE	•
010C	Č	Ccaron	LATIN CAPITAL LETTER C WITH CARON	•
010D	č	ccaron	LATIN SMALL LETTER C WITH CARON	•
010E	Ď	Dcaron	LATIN CAPITAL LETTER D WITH CARON	•
010F	ď	dcaron	LATIN SMALL LETTER D WITH CARON	•
0110	Đ	Dcroat	LATIN CAPITAL LETTER D WITH STROKE	•
0111	đ	dcroat	LATIN SMALL LETTER D WITH STROKE	•
0112	Ē	Emacron	LATIN CAPITAL LETTER E WITH MACRON	•
0113	ē	emacron	LATIN SMALL LETTER E WITH MACRON	•
0116	Ė	Edotaccent	LATIN CAPITAL LETTER E WITH DOT ABOVE	•
0117	ė	edotaccent	LATIN SMALL LETTER E WITH DOT ABOVE	•
0118	Ę	Eogonek	LATIN CAPITAL LETTER E WITH OGONEK	•
0119	ę	eogonek	LATIN SMALL LETTER E WITH OGONEK	•
011A	Ě	Ecaron	LATIN CAPITAL LETTER E WITH CARON	•
011B	ě	ecaron	LATIN SMALL LETTER E WITH CARON	•
011E	Ğ	Gbreve	LATIN CAPITAL LETTER G WITH BREVE	•
011F	ğ	gbreve	LATIN SMALL LETTER G WITH BREVE	•
0122	Ģ	uni0122	LATIN CAPITAL LETTER G WITH CEDILLA	•
0123	ģ	uni0123	LATIN SMALL LETTER G WITH CEDILLA	•
012A	Ī	Imacron	LATIN CAPITAL LETTER I WITH MACRON	•
012B	ī	imacron	LATIN SMALL LETTER I WITH MACRON	•
012E	Į	Iogonek	LATIN CAPITAL LETTER I WITH OGONEK	•
012F	į	iogonek	LATIN SMALL LETTER I WITH OGONEK	•
0130	İ	Idotaccent	LATIN CAPITAL LETTER I WITH DOT ABOVE	•
0131	ı	dotlessi	LATIN SMALL LETTER DOTLESS I	
0136	Ķ	uni0136	LATIN CAPITAL LETTER K WITH CEDILLA	•
0137	ķ	uni0137	LATIN SMALL LETTER K WITH CEDILLA	•
0139	Ĺ	Lacute	LATIN CAPITAL LETTER L WITH ACUTE	•
013A	ĺ	lacute	LATIN SMALL LETTER L WITH ACUTE	•
013B	Ļ	uni013B	LATIN CAPITAL LETTER L WITH CEDILLA	•
013C	ļ	uni013C	LATIN SMALL LETTER L WITH CEDILLA	•
013D	Ľ	Lcaron	LATIN CAPITAL LETTER L WITH CARON	•
013E	ľ	lcaron	LATIN SMALL LETTER L WITH CARON	•
0141	Ł	Lslash	LATIN CAPITAL LETTER L WITH STROKE	
0142	ł	lslash	LATIN SMALL LETTER L WITH STROKE	
0143	Ń	Nacute	LATIN CAPITAL LETTER N WITH ACUTE	•
0144	ń	nacute	LATIN SMALL LETTER N WITH ACUTE	•
0145	Ņ	uni0145	LATIN CAPITAL LETTER N WITH CEDILLA	•
0146	ņ	uni0146	LATIN SMALL LETTER N WITH CEDILLA	•
0147	Ň	Ncaron	LATIN CAPITAL LETTER N WITH CARON	•
0148	ň	ncaron	LATIN SMALL LETTER N WITH CARON	•
014C	Ō	Omacron	LATIN CAPITAL LETTER O WITH MACRON	•
014D	ō	omacron	LATIN SMALL LETTER O WITH MACRON	•
0150	Ő	Ohungarumlaut	LATIN CAPITAL LETTER O WITH DOUBLE ACUTE	•
0151	ő	ohungarumlaut	LATIN SMALL LETTER O WITH DOUBLE ACUTE	•
0152	Œ	OE	LATIN CAPITAL LIGATURE OE	
0153	œ	oe	LATIN SMALL LIGATURE OE	
0154	Ŕ	Racute	LATIN CAPITAL LETTER R WITH ACUTE	•
0155	ŕ	racute	LATIN SMALL LETTER R WITH ACUTE	•
0156	Ŗ	uni0156	LATIN CAPITAL LETTER R WITH CEDILLA	•
0157	ŗ	uni0157	LATIN SMALL LETTER R WITH CEDILLA	•
0158	Ř	Rcaron	LATIN CAPITAL LETTER R WITH CARON	•
0159	ř	rcaron	LATIN SMALL LETTER R WITH CARON	•
015A	Ś	Sacute	LATIN CAPITAL LETTER S WITH ACUTE	•
015B	ś	sacute	LATIN SMALL LETTER S WITH ACUTE	•
015E	Ş	uni015E	LATIN CAPITAL LETTER S WITH CEDILLA	•
015F	ş	uni015F	LATIN SMALL LETTER S WITH CEDILLA	•
0160	Š	Scaron	LATIN CAPITAL LETTER S WITH CARON	
0161	š	scaron	LATIN SMALL LETTER S WITH CARON	
0162	Ţ	uni0162	LATIN CAPITAL LETTER T WITH CEDILLA	•
0163	ţ	uni0163	LATIN SMALL LETTER T WITH CEDILLA	•
0164	Ť	Tcaron	LATIN CAPITAL LETTER T WITH CARON	•
0165	ť	tcaron	LATIN SMALL LETTER T WITH CARON	•
016A	Ū	Umacron	LATIN CAPITAL LETTER U WITH MACRON	•
016B	ū	umacron	LATIN SMALL LETTER U WITH MACRON	•
016E	Ů	Uring	LATIN CAPITAL LETTER U WITH RING ABOVE	•
016F	ů	uring	LATIN SMALL LETTER U WITH RING ABOVE	•
0170	Ű	Uhungarumlaut	LATIN CAPITAL LETTER U WITH DOUBLE ACUTE	•
0171	ű	uhungarumlaut	LATIN SMALL LETTER U WITH DOUBLE ACUTE	•
0172	Ų	Uogonek	LATIN CAPITAL LETTER U WITH OGONEK	•
0173	ų	uogonek	LATIN SMALL LETTER U WITH OGONEK	•
0178	Ÿ	Ydieresis	LATIN CAPITAL LETTER Y WITH DIAERESIS	
0179	Ź	Zacute	LATIN CAPITAL LETTER Z WITH ACUTE	•
017A	ź	zacute	LATIN SMALL LETTER Z WITH ACUTE	•
017B	Ż	Zdotaccent	LATIN CAPITAL LETTER Z WITH DOT ABOVE	•
017C	ż	zdotaccent	LATIN SMALL LETTER Z WITH DOT ABOVE	•
017D	Ž	Zcaron	LATIN CAPITAL LETTER Z WITH CARON	
017E	ž	zcaron	LATIN SMALL LETTER Z WITH CARON	
0192	ƒ	florin	LATIN SMALL LETTER F WITH HOOK	
0218	Ș	uni0218	LATIN CAPITAL LETTER S WITH COMMA BELOW	•
0219	ș	uni0219	LATIN SMALL LETTER S WITH COMMA BELOW	•
021A	Ț	uni021A	LATIN CAPITAL LETTER T WITH COMMA BELOW	•
021B	ț	uni021B	LATIN SMALL LETTER T WITH COMMA BELOW	•
02C6	ˆ	circumflex	MODIFIER LETTER CIRCUMFLEX ACCENT	
02C7	ˇ	caron	CARON	
02C9	ˉ	uni02C9	MODIFIER LETTER MACRON	
02D8	˘	breve	BREVE	
02D9	˙	dotaccent	DOT ABOVE	
02DA	˚	ring	RING ABOVE	
02DB	˛	ogonek	OGONEK	
02DC	˜	tilde	SMALL TILDE	
02DD	˝	hungarumlaut	DOUBLE ACUTE ACCENT	
03C0	π	pi	GREEK SMALL LETTER PI	
2013	–	endash	EN DASH	
2014	—	emdash	EM DASH	
2018	‘	quoteleft	LEFT SINGLE QUOTATION MARK	
2019	’	quoteright	RIGHT SINGLE QUOTATION MARK	
201A	‚	quotesinglbase	SINGLE LOW-9 QUOTATION MARK	
201C	“	quotedblleft	LEFT DOUBLE QUOTATION MARK	
201D	”	quotedblright	RIGHT DOUBLE QUOTATION MARK	
201E	„	quotedblbase	DOUBLE LOW-9 QUOTATION MARK	
2020	†	dagger	DAGGER	
2021	‡	daggerdbl	DOUBLE DAGGER	
2022	•	bullet	BULLET	
2026	…	ellipsis	HORIZONTAL ELLIPSIS	
2030	‰	perthousand	PER MILLE SIGN	
2039	‹	guilsinglleft	SINGLE LEFT-POINTING ANGLE QUOTATION MARK	
203A	›	guilsinglright	SINGLE RIGHT-POINTING ANGLE QUOTATION MARK	
2044	/	fraction	FRACTION SLASH	
20AC	€	Euro	EURO SIGN	
20BA	₺	uni20BA	TURKISH LIRA SIGN	•
20BD	₽	uni20BD	RUBLE SIGN	•
2113	ℓ	uni2113	SCRIPT SMALL L	
2122	™	trademark	TRADE MARK SIGN	
2126	Ω	uni2126	OHM SIGN	
212E	℮	estimated	ESTIMATED SYMBOL	
2202	∂	partialdiff	PARTIAL DIFFERENTIAL	
2206	∆	uni2206	INCREMENT	
220F	∏	product	N-ARY PRODUCT	
2211	∑	summation	N-ARY SUMMATION	
2212	−	minus	MINUS SIGN	
2215	∕	uni2215	DIVISION SLASH	
2219	∙	uni2219	BULLET OPERATOR	
221A	√	radical	SQUARE ROOT	
221E	∞	infinity	INFINITY	
222B	∫	integral	INTEGRAL	
2248	≈	approxequal	ALMOST EQUAL TO	
2260	≠	notequal	NOT EQUAL TO	
2264	≤	lessequal	LESS-THAN OR EQUAL TO	
2265	≥	greaterequal	GREATER-THAN OR EQUAL TO	
25CA	◊	lozenge	LOZENGE	
FB01	ﬁ	fi	LATIN SMALL LIGATURE FI	
FB02	ﬂ	fl	LATIN SMALL LIGATURE FL	

=== Adobe Latin 4 ===
Combined Characters

Unicode	Character	Glyph name	Character name	Added
0047,0303	G̃	uni00470303	LATIN CAPITAL LETTER G, COMBINING TILDE	•
0067,0303	g̃	uni00670303	LATIN SMALL LETTER G, COMBINING TILDE	•

Pre-composed Characters

Table: Adobe Latin 4: Pre-composed Characters
Unicode	Character	Glyph name	Character name	Added
0020		space	SPACE	
0021	!	exclam	EXCLAMATION MARK	
0022	"	quotedbl	QUOTATION MARK	
0023	#	numbersign	NUMBER SIGN	
0024	$	dollar	DOLLAR SIGN	
0025	%	percent	PERCENT SIGN	
0026	&	ampersand	AMPERSAND	
0027	'	quotesingle	APOSTROPHE	
0028	(	parenleft	LEFT PARENTHESIS	
0029	)	parenright	RIGHT PARENTHESIS	
002A	*	asterisk	ASTERISK	
002B	+	plus	PLUS SIGN	
002C	,	comma	COMMA	
002D	-	hyphen	HYPHEN-MINUS	
002E	.	period	FULL STOP	
002F	/	slash	SOLIDUS	
0030	0	zero	DIGIT ZERO	
0031	1	one	DIGIT ONE	
0032	2	two	DIGIT TWO	
0033	3	three	DIGIT THREE	
0034	4	four	DIGIT FOUR	
0035	5	five	DIGIT FIVE	
0036	6	six	DIGIT SIX	
0037	7	seven	DIGIT SEVEN	
0038	8	eight	DIGIT EIGHT	
0039	9	nine	DIGIT NINE	
003A	:	colon	COLON	
003B	;	semicolon	SEMICOLON	
003C	<	less	LESS-THAN SIGN	
003D	=	equal	EQUALS SIGN	
003E	>	greater	GREATER-THAN SIGN	
003F	?	question	QUESTION MARK	
0040	@	at	COMMERCIAL AT	
0041	A	A	LATIN CAPITAL LETTER A	
0042	B	B	LATIN CAPITAL LETTER B	
0043	C	C	LATIN CAPITAL LETTER C	
0044	D	D	LATIN CAPITAL LETTER D	
0045	E	E	LATIN CAPITAL LETTER E	
0046	F	F	LATIN CAPITAL LETTER F	
0047	G	G	LATIN CAPITAL LETTER G	
0048	H	H	LATIN CAPITAL LETTER H	
0049	I	I	LATIN CAPITAL LETTER I	
004A	J	J	LATIN CAPITAL LETTER J	
004B	K	K	LATIN CAPITAL LETTER K	
004C	L	L	LATIN CAPITAL LETTER L	
004D	M	M	LATIN CAPITAL LETTER M	
004E	N	N	LATIN CAPITAL LETTER N	
004F	O	O	LATIN CAPITAL LETTER O	
0050	P	P	LATIN CAPITAL LETTER P	
0051	Q	Q	LATIN CAPITAL LETTER Q	
0052	R	R	LATIN CAPITAL LETTER R	
0053	S	S	LATIN CAPITAL LETTER S	
0054	T	T	LATIN CAPITAL LETTER T	
0055	U	U	LATIN CAPITAL LETTER U	
0056	V	V	LATIN CAPITAL LETTER V	
0057	W	W	LATIN CAPITAL LETTER W	
0058	X	X	LATIN CAPITAL LETTER X	
0059	Y	Y	LATIN CAPITAL LETTER Y	
005A	Z	Z	LATIN CAPITAL LETTER Z	
005B	[	bracketleft	LEFT SQUARE BRACKET	
005C	\	backslash	REVERSE SOLIDUS	
005D	]	bracketright	RIGHT SQUARE BRACKET	
005E	^	asciicircum	CIRCUMFLEX ACCENT	
005F	_	underscore	LOW LINE	
0060	`	grave	GRAVE ACCENT	
0061	a	a	LATIN SMALL LETTER A	
0062	b	b	LATIN SMALL LETTER B	
0063	c	c	LATIN SMALL LETTER C	
0064	d	d	LATIN SMALL LETTER D	
0065	e	e	LATIN SMALL LETTER E	
0066	f	f	LATIN SMALL LETTER F	
0067	g	g	LATIN SMALL LETTER G	
0068	h	h	LATIN SMALL LETTER H	
0069	i	i	LATIN SMALL LETTER I	
006A	j	j	LATIN SMALL LETTER J	
006B	k	k	LATIN SMALL LETTER K	
006C	l	l	LATIN SMALL LETTER L	
006D	m	m	LATIN SMALL LETTER M	
006E	n	n	LATIN SMALL LETTER N	
006F	o	o	LATIN SMALL LETTER O	
0070	p	p	LATIN SMALL LETTER P	
0071	q	q	LATIN SMALL LETTER Q	
0072	r	r	LATIN SMALL LETTER R	
0073	s	s	LATIN SMALL LETTER S	
0074	t	t	LATIN SMALL LETTER T	
0075	u	u	LATIN SMALL LETTER U	
0076	v	v	LATIN SMALL LETTER V	
0077	w	w	LATIN SMALL LETTER W	
0078	x	x	LATIN SMALL LETTER X	
0079	y	y	LATIN SMALL LETTER Y	
007A	z	z	LATIN SMALL LETTER Z	
007B	{	braceleft	LEFT CURLY BRACKET	
007C	|	bar	VERTICAL LINE	
007D	}	braceright	RIGHT CURLY BRACKET	
007E	~	asciitilde	TILDE	
00A0		uni00A0	NO-BREAK SPACE	
00A1	¡	exclamdown	INVERTED EXCLAMATION MARK	
00A2	¢	cent	CENT SIGN	
00A3	£	sterling	POUND SIGN	
00A4	¤	currency	CURRENCY SIGN	
00A5	¥	yen	YEN SIGN	
00A6	¦	brokenbar	BROKEN BAR	
00A7	§	section	SECTION SIGN	
00A8	¨	dieresis	DIAERESIS	
00A9	©	copyright	COPYRIGHT SIGN	
00AA	ª	ordfeminine	FEMININE ORDINAL INDICATOR	
00AB	«	guillemotleft	LEFT-POINTING DOUBLE ANGLE QUOTATION MARK	
00AC	¬	logicalnot	NOT SIGN	
00AD		uni00AD	SOFT HYPHEN	
00AE	®	registered	REGISTERED SIGN	
00AF	¯	macron	MACRON	
00B0	°	degree	DEGREE SIGN	
00B1	±	plusminus	PLUS-MINUS SIGN	
00B2	²	twosuperior	SUPERSCRIPT TWO	
00B3	³	threesuperior	SUPERSCRIPT THREE	
00B4	´	acute	ACUTE ACCENT	
00B5	µ	uni00B5	MICRO SIGN	
00B6	¶	paragraph	PILCROW SIGN	
00B7	·	periodcentered	MIDDLE DOT	
00B8	¸	cedilla	CEDILLA	
00B9	¹	onesuperior	SUPERSCRIPT ONE	
00BA	º	ordmasculine	MASCULINE ORDINAL INDICATOR	
00BB	»	guillemotright	RIGHT-POINTING DOUBLE ANGLE QUOTATION MARK	
00BC	¼	onequarter	VULGAR FRACTION ONE QUARTER	
00BD	½	onehalf	VULGAR FRACTION ONE HALF	
00BE	¾	threequarters	VULGAR FRACTION THREE QUARTERS	
00BF	¿	questiondown	INVERTED QUESTION MARK	
00C0	À	Agrave	LATIN CAPITAL LETTER A WITH GRAVE	
00C1	Á	Aacute	LATIN CAPITAL LETTER A WITH ACUTE	
00C2	Â	Acircumflex	LATIN CAPITAL LETTER A WITH CIRCUMFLEX	
00C3	Ã	Atilde	LATIN CAPITAL LETTER A WITH TILDE	
00C4	Ä	Adieresis	LATIN CAPITAL LETTER A WITH DIAERESIS	
00C5	Å	Aring	LATIN CAPITAL LETTER A WITH RING ABOVE	
00C6	Æ	AE	LATIN CAPITAL LETTER AE	
00C7	Ç	Ccedilla	LATIN CAPITAL LETTER C WITH CEDILLA	
00C8	È	Egrave	LATIN CAPITAL LETTER E WITH GRAVE	
00C9	É	Eacute	LATIN CAPITAL LETTER E WITH ACUTE	
00CA	Ê	Ecircumflex	LATIN CAPITAL LETTER E WITH CIRCUMFLEX	
00CB	Ë	Edieresis	LATIN CAPITAL LETTER E WITH DIAERESIS	
00CC	Ì	Igrave	LATIN CAPITAL LETTER I WITH GRAVE	
00CD	Í	Iacute	LATIN CAPITAL LETTER I WITH ACUTE	
00CE	Î	Icircumflex	LATIN CAPITAL LETTER I WITH CIRCUMFLEX	
00CF	Ï	Idieresis	LATIN CAPITAL LETTER I WITH DIAERESIS	
00D0	Ð	Eth	LATIN CAPITAL LETTER ETH	
00D1	Ñ	Ntilde	LATIN CAPITAL LETTER N WITH TILDE	
00D2	Ò	Ograve	LATIN CAPITAL LETTER O WITH GRAVE	
00D3	Ó	Oacute	LATIN CAPITAL LETTER O WITH ACUTE	
00D4	Ô	Ocircumflex	LATIN CAPITAL LETTER O WITH CIRCUMFLEX	
00D5	Õ	Otilde	LATIN CAPITAL LETTER O WITH TILDE	
00D6	Ö	Odieresis	LATIN CAPITAL LETTER O WITH DIAERESIS	
00D7	×	multiply	MULTIPLICATION SIGN	
00D8	Ø	Oslash	LATIN CAPITAL LETTER O WITH STROKE	
00D9	Ù	Ugrave	LATIN CAPITAL LETTER U WITH GRAVE	
00DA	Ú	Uacute	LATIN CAPITAL LETTER U WITH ACUTE	
00DB	Û	Ucircumflex	LATIN CAPITAL LETTER U WITH CIRCUMFLEX	
00DC	Ü	Udieresis	LATIN CAPITAL LETTER U WITH DIAERESIS	
00DD	Ý	Yacute	LATIN CAPITAL LETTER Y WITH ACUTE	
00DE	Þ	Thorn	LATIN CAPITAL LETTER THORN	
00DF	ß	germandbls	LATIN SMALL LETTER SHARP S	
00E0	à	agrave	LATIN SMALL LETTER A WITH GRAVE	
00E1	á	aacute	LATIN SMALL LETTER A WITH ACUTE	
00E2	â	acircumflex	LATIN SMALL LETTER A WITH CIRCUMFLEX	
00E3	ã	atilde	LATIN SMALL LETTER A WITH TILDE	
00E4	ä	adieresis	LATIN SMALL LETTER A WITH DIAERESIS	
00E5	å	aring	LATIN SMALL LETTER A WITH RING ABOVE	
00E6	æ	ae	LATIN SMALL LETTER AE	
00E7	ç	ccedilla	LATIN SMALL LETTER C WITH CEDILLA	
00E8	è	egrave	LATIN SMALL LETTER E WITH GRAVE	
00E9	é	eacute	LATIN SMALL LETTER E WITH ACUTE	
00EA	ê	ecircumflex	LATIN SMALL LETTER E WITH CIRCUMFLEX	
00EB	ë	edieresis	LATIN SMALL LETTER E WITH DIAERESIS	
00EC	ì	igrave	LATIN SMALL LETTER I WITH GRAVE	
00ED	í	iacute	LATIN SMALL LETTER I WITH ACUTE	
00EE	î	icircumflex	LATIN SMALL LETTER I WITH CIRCUMFLEX	
00EF	ï	idieresis	LATIN SMALL LETTER I WITH DIAERESIS	
00F0	ð	eth	LATIN SMALL LETTER ETH	
00F1	ñ	ntilde	LATIN SMALL LETTER N WITH TILDE	
00F2	ò	ograve	LATIN SMALL LETTER O WITH GRAVE	
00F3	ó	oacute	LATIN SMALL LETTER O WITH ACUTE	
00F4	ô	ocircumflex	LATIN SMALL LETTER O WITH CIRCUMFLEX	
00F5	õ	otilde	LATIN SMALL LETTER O WITH TILDE	
00F6	ö	odieresis	LATIN SMALL LETTER O WITH DIAERESIS	
00F7	÷	divide	DIVISION SIGN	
00F8	ø	oslash	LATIN SMALL LETTER O WITH STROKE	
00F9	ù	ugrave	LATIN SMALL LETTER U WITH GRAVE	
00FA	ú	uacute	LATIN SMALL LETTER U WITH ACUTE	
00FB	û	ucircumflex	LATIN SMALL LETTER U WITH CIRCUMFLEX	
00FC	ü	udieresis	LATIN SMALL LETTER U WITH DIAERESIS	
00FD	ý	yacute	LATIN SMALL LETTER Y WITH ACUTE	
00FE	þ	thorn	LATIN SMALL LETTER THORN	
00FF	ÿ	ydieresis	LATIN SMALL LETTER Y WITH DIAERESIS	
0100	Ā	Amacron	LATIN CAPITAL LETTER A WITH MACRON	
0101	ā	amacron	LATIN SMALL LETTER A WITH MACRON	
0102	Ă	Abreve	LATIN CAPITAL LETTER A WITH BREVE	
0103	ă	abreve	LATIN SMALL LETTER A WITH BREVE	
0104	Ą	Aogonek	LATIN CAPITAL LETTER A WITH OGONEK	
0105	ą	aogonek	LATIN SMALL LETTER A WITH OGONEK	
0106	Ć	Cacute	LATIN CAPITAL LETTER C WITH ACUTE	
0107	ć	cacute	LATIN SMALL LETTER C WITH ACUTE	
0108	Ĉ	Ccircumflex	LATIN CAPITAL LETTER C WITH CIRCUMFLEX	•
0109	ĉ	ccircumflex	LATIN SMALL LETTER C WITH CIRCUMFLEX	•
010A	Ċ	Cdotaccent	LATIN CAPITAL LETTER C WITH DOT ABOVE	•
010B	ċ	cdotaccent	LATIN SMALL LETTER C WITH DOT ABOVE	•
010C	Č	Ccaron	LATIN CAPITAL LETTER C WITH CARON	
010D	č	ccaron	LATIN SMALL LETTER C WITH CARON	
010E	Ď	Dcaron	LATIN CAPITAL LETTER D WITH CARON	
010F	ď	dcaron	LATIN SMALL LETTER D WITH CARON	
0110	Đ	Dcroat	LATIN CAPITAL LETTER D WITH STROKE	
0111	đ	dcroat	LATIN SMALL LETTER D WITH STROKE	
0112	Ē	Emacron	LATIN CAPITAL LETTER E WITH MACRON	
0113	ē	emacron	LATIN SMALL LETTER E WITH MACRON	
0114	Ĕ	Ebreve	LATIN CAPITAL LETTER E WITH BREVE	•
0115	ĕ	ebreve	LATIN SMALL LETTER E WITH BREVE	•
0116	Ė	Edotaccent	LATIN CAPITAL LETTER E WITH DOT ABOVE	
0117	ė	edotaccent	LATIN SMALL LETTER E WITH DOT ABOVE	
0118	Ę	Eogonek	LATIN CAPITAL LETTER E WITH OGONEK	
0119	ę	eogonek	LATIN SMALL LETTER E WITH OGONEK	
011A	Ě	Ecaron	LATIN CAPITAL LETTER E WITH CARON	
011B	ě	ecaron	LATIN SMALL LETTER E WITH CARON	
011C	Ĝ	Gcircumflex	LATIN CAPITAL LETTER G WITH CIRCUMFLEX	•
011D	ĝ	gcircumflex	LATIN SMALL LETTER G WITH CIRCUMFLEX	•
011E	Ğ	Gbreve	LATIN CAPITAL LETTER G WITH BREVE	
011F	ğ	gbreve	LATIN SMALL LETTER G WITH BREVE	
0120	Ġ	Gdotaccent	LATIN CAPITAL LETTER G WITH DOT ABOVE	•
0121	ġ	gdotaccent	LATIN SMALL LETTER G WITH DOT ABOVE	•
0122	Ģ	uni0122	LATIN CAPITAL LETTER G WITH CEDILLA	
0123	ģ	uni0123	LATIN SMALL LETTER G WITH CEDILLA	
0124	Ĥ	Hcircumflex	LATIN CAPITAL LETTER H WITH CIRCUMFLEX	•
0125	ĥ	hcircumflex	LATIN SMALL LETTER H WITH CIRCUMFLEX	•
0126	Ħ	Hbar	LATIN CAPITAL LETTER H WITH STROKE	•
0127	ħ	hbar	LATIN SMALL LETTER H WITH STROKE	•
0128	Ĩ	Itilde	LATIN CAPITAL LETTER I WITH TILDE	•
0129	ĩ	itilde	LATIN SMALL LETTER I WITH TILDE	•
012A	Ī	Imacron	LATIN CAPITAL LETTER I WITH MACRON	
012B	ī	imacron	LATIN SMALL LETTER I WITH MACRON	
012E	Į	Iogonek	LATIN CAPITAL LETTER I WITH OGONEK	
012F	į	iogonek	LATIN SMALL LETTER I WITH OGONEK	
0130	İ	Idotaccent	LATIN CAPITAL LETTER I WITH DOT ABOVE	
0131	ı	dotlessi	LATIN SMALL LETTER DOTLESS I	
0134	Ĵ	Jcircumflex	LATIN CAPITAL LETTER J WITH CIRCUMFLEX	•
0135	ĵ	jcircumflex	LATIN SMALL LETTER J WITH CIRCUMFLEX	•
0136	Ķ	uni0136	LATIN CAPITAL LETTER K WITH CEDILLA	
0137	ķ	uni0137	LATIN SMALL LETTER K WITH CEDILLA	
0138	ĸ	kgreenlandic	LATIN SMALL LETTER KRA	•
0139	Ĺ	Lacute	LATIN CAPITAL LETTER L WITH ACUTE	
013A	ĺ	lacute	LATIN SMALL LETTER L WITH ACUTE	
013B	Ļ	uni013B	LATIN CAPITAL LETTER L WITH CEDILLA	
013C	ļ	uni013C	LATIN SMALL LETTER L WITH CEDILLA	
013D	Ľ	Lcaron	LATIN CAPITAL LETTER L WITH CARON	
013E	ľ	lcaron	LATIN SMALL LETTER L WITH CARON	
013F	Ŀ	Ldot	LATIN CAPITAL LETTER L WITH MIDDLE DOT	•
0140	ŀ	ldot	LATIN SMALL LETTER L WITH MIDDLE DOT	•
0141	Ł	Lslash	LATIN CAPITAL LETTER L WITH STROKE	
0142	ł	lslash	LATIN SMALL LETTER L WITH STROKE	
0143	Ń	Nacute	LATIN CAPITAL LETTER N WITH ACUTE	
0144	ń	nacute	LATIN SMALL LETTER N WITH ACUTE	
0145	Ņ	uni0145	LATIN CAPITAL LETTER N WITH CEDILLA	
0146	ņ	uni0146	LATIN SMALL LETTER N WITH CEDILLA	
0147	Ň	Ncaron	LATIN CAPITAL LETTER N WITH CARON	
0148	ň	ncaron	LATIN SMALL LETTER N WITH CARON	
0149	ŉ	napostrophe	LATIN SMALL LETTER N PRECEDED BY APOSTROPHE	•
014C	Ō	Omacron	LATIN CAPITAL LETTER O WITH MACRON	
014D	ō	omacron	LATIN SMALL LETTER O WITH MACRON	
0150	Ő	Ohungarumlaut	LATIN CAPITAL LETTER O WITH DOUBLE ACUTE	
0151	ő	ohungarumlaut	LATIN SMALL LETTER O WITH DOUBLE ACUTE	
0152	Œ	OE	LATIN CAPITAL LIGATURE OE	
0153	œ	oe	LATIN SMALL LIGATURE OE	
0154	Ŕ	Racute	LATIN CAPITAL LETTER R WITH ACUTE	
0155	ŕ	racute	LATIN SMALL LETTER R WITH ACUTE	
0156	Ŗ	uni0156	LATIN CAPITAL LETTER R WITH CEDILLA	
0157	ŗ	uni0157	LATIN SMALL LETTER R WITH CEDILLA	
0158	Ř	Rcaron	LATIN CAPITAL LETTER R WITH CARON	
0159	ř	rcaron	LATIN SMALL LETTER R WITH CARON	
015A	Ś	Sacute	LATIN CAPITAL LETTER S WITH ACUTE	
015B	ś	sacute	LATIN SMALL LETTER S WITH ACUTE	
015C	Ŝ	Scircumflex	LATIN CAPITAL LETTER S WITH CIRCUMFLEX	•
015D	ŝ	scircumflex	LATIN SMALL LETTER S WITH CIRCUMFLEX	•
015E	Ş	uni015E	LATIN CAPITAL LETTER S WITH CEDILLA	
015F	ş	uni015F	LATIN SMALL LETTER S WITH CEDILLA	
0160	Š	Scaron	LATIN CAPITAL LETTER S WITH CARON	
0161	š	scaron	LATIN SMALL LETTER S WITH CARON	
0162	Ţ	uni0162	LATIN CAPITAL LETTER T WITH CEDILLA	
0163	ţ	uni0163	LATIN SMALL LETTER T WITH CEDILLA	
0164	Ť	Tcaron	LATIN CAPITAL LETTER T WITH CARON	
0165	ť	tcaron	LATIN SMALL LETTER T WITH CARON	
0168	Ũ	Utilde	LATIN CAPITAL LETTER U WITH TILDE	•
0169	ũ	utilde	LATIN SMALL LETTER U WITH TILDE	•
016A	Ū	Umacron	LATIN CAPITAL LETTER U WITH MACRON	
016B	ū	umacron	LATIN SMALL LETTER U WITH MACRON	
016C	Ŭ	Ubreve	LATIN CAPITAL LETTER U WITH BREVE	•
016D	ŭ	ubreve	LATIN SMALL LETTER U WITH BREVE	•
016E	Ů	Uring	LATIN CAPITAL LETTER U WITH RING ABOVE	
016F	ů	uring	LATIN SMALL LETTER U WITH RING ABOVE	
0170	Ű	Uhungarumlaut	LATIN CAPITAL LETTER U WITH DOUBLE ACUTE	
0171	ű	uhungarumlaut	LATIN SMALL LETTER U WITH DOUBLE ACUTE	
0172	Ų	Uogonek	LATIN CAPITAL LETTER U WITH OGONEK	
0173	ų	uogonek	LATIN SMALL LETTER U WITH OGONEK	
0174	Ŵ	Wcircumflex	LATIN CAPITAL LETTER W WITH CIRCUMFLEX	•
0175	ŵ	wcircumflex	LATIN SMALL LETTER W WITH CIRCUMFLEX	•
0176	Ŷ	Ycircumflex	LATIN CAPITAL LETTER Y WITH CIRCUMFLEX	•
0177	ŷ	ycircumflex	LATIN SMALL LETTER Y WITH CIRCUMFLEX	•
0178	Ÿ	Ydieresis	LATIN CAPITAL LETTER Y WITH DIAERESIS	
0179	Ź	Zacute	LATIN CAPITAL LETTER Z WITH ACUTE	
017A	ź	zacute	LATIN SMALL LETTER Z WITH ACUTE	
017B	Ż	Zdotaccent	LATIN CAPITAL LETTER Z WITH DOT ABOVE	
017C	ż	zdotaccent	LATIN SMALL LETTER Z WITH DOT ABOVE	
017D	Ž	Zcaron	LATIN CAPITAL LETTER Z WITH CARON	
017E	ž	zcaron	LATIN SMALL LETTER Z WITH CARON	
018F	Ə	uni018F	LATIN CAPITAL LETTER SCHWA	•
0192	ƒ	florin	LATIN SMALL LETTER F WITH HOOK	
01A0	Ơ	Ohorn	LATIN CAPITAL LETTER O WITH HORN	•
01A1	ơ	ohorn	LATIN SMALL LETTER O WITH HORN	•
01AF	Ư	Uhorn	LATIN CAPITAL LETTER U WITH HORN	•
01B0	ư	uhorn	LATIN SMALL LETTER U WITH HORN	•
01CD	Ǎ	uni01CD	LATIN CAPITAL LETTER A WITH CARON	•
01CE	ǎ	uni01CE	LATIN SMALL LETTER A WITH CARON	•
01CF	Ǐ	uni01CF	LATIN CAPITAL LETTER I WITH CARON	•
01D0	ǐ	uni01D0	LATIN SMALL LETTER I WITH CARON	•
01D1	Ǒ	uni01D1	LATIN CAPITAL LETTER O WITH CARON	•
01D2	ǒ	uni01D2	LATIN SMALL LETTER O WITH CARON	•
01D3	Ǔ	uni01D3	LATIN CAPITAL LETTER U WITH CARON	•
01D4	ǔ	uni01D4	LATIN SMALL LETTER U WITH CARON	•
01D5	Ǖ	uni01D5	LATIN CAPITAL LETTER U WITH DIAERESIS AND MACRON	•
01D6	ǖ	uni01D6	LATIN SMALL LETTER U WITH DIAERESIS AND MACRON	•
01D7	Ǘ	uni01D7	LATIN CAPITAL LETTER U WITH DIAERESIS AND ACUTE	•
01D8	ǘ	uni01D8	LATIN SMALL LETTER U WITH DIAERESIS AND ACUTE	•
01D9	Ǚ	uni01D9	LATIN CAPITAL LETTER U WITH DIAERESIS AND CARON	•
01DA	ǚ	uni01DA	LATIN SMALL LETTER U WITH DIAERESIS AND CARON	•
01DB	Ǜ	uni01DB	LATIN CAPITAL LETTER U WITH DIAERESIS AND GRAVE	•
01DC	ǜ	uni01DC	LATIN SMALL LETTER U WITH DIAERESIS AND GRAVE	•
01E6	Ǧ	Gcaron	LATIN CAPITAL LETTER G WITH CARON	•
01E7	ǧ	gcaron	LATIN SMALL LETTER G WITH CARON	•
0218	Ș	uni0218	LATIN CAPITAL LETTER S WITH COMMA BELOW	
0219	ș	uni0219	LATIN SMALL LETTER S WITH COMMA BELOW	
021A	Ț	uni021A	LATIN CAPITAL LETTER T WITH COMMA BELOW	
021B	ț	uni021B	LATIN SMALL LETTER T WITH COMMA BELOW	
0237	ȷ	uni0237	LATIN SMALL LETTER DOTLESS J	•
0251	ɑ	uni0251	LATIN SMALL LETTER ALPHA	•
0259	ə	uni0259	LATIN SMALL LETTER SCHWA	•
0261	ɡ	uni0261	LATIN SMALL LETTER SCRIPT G	•
02BB	ʻ	uni02BB	MODIFIER LETTER TURNED COMMA	•
02BC	ʼ	uni02BC	MODIFIER LETTER APOSTROPHE	•
02BE	ʾ	uni02BE	MODIFIER LETTER RIGHT HALF RING	•
02BF	ʿ	uni02BF	MODIFIER LETTER LEFT HALF RING	•
02C6	ˆ	circumflex	MODIFIER LETTER CIRCUMFLEX ACCENT	
02C7	ˇ	caron	CARON	
02C8	ˈ	uni02C8	MODIFIER LETTER VERTICAL LINE	•
02C9	ˉ	uni02C9	MODIFIER LETTER MACRON	
02CA	ˊ	uni02CA	MODIFIER LETTER ACUTE ACCENT	•
02CB	ˋ	uni02CB	MODIFIER LETTER GRAVE ACCENT	•
02CC	ˌ	uni02CC	MODIFIER LETTER LOW VERTICAL LINE	•
02D8	˘	breve	BREVE	
02D9	˙	dotaccent	DOT ABOVE	
02DA	˚	ring	RING ABOVE	
02DB	˛	ogonek	OGONEK	
02DC	˜	tilde	SMALL TILDE	
02DD	˝	hungarumlaut	DOUBLE ACUTE ACCENT	
0300	̀	gravecomb	COMBINING GRAVE ACCENT	•
0301	́	acutecomb	COMBINING ACUTE ACCENT	•
0302	̂	uni0302	COMBINING CIRCUMFLEX ACCENT	•
0303	̃	tildecomb	COMBINING TILDE	•
0304	̄	uni0304	COMBINING MACRON	•
0306	̆	uni0306	COMBINING BREVE	•
0307	̇	uni0307	COMBINING DOT ABOVE	•
0308	̈	uni0308	COMBINING DIAERESIS	•
0309	̉	hookabovecomb	COMBINING HOOK ABOVE	•
030A	̊	uni030A	COMBINING RING ABOVE	•
030B	̋	uni030B	COMBINING DOUBLE ACUTE ACCENT	•
030C	̌	uni030C	COMBINING CARON	•
031B	̛	uni031B	COMBINING HORN	•
0323	̣	dotbelowcomb	COMBINING DOT BELOW	•
0324	̤	uni0324	COMBINING DIAERESIS BELOW	•
0326	̦	uni0326	COMBINING COMMA BELOW	•
0327	̧	uni0327	COMBINING CEDILLA	•
0328	̨	uni0328	COMBINING OGONEK	•
032E	̮	uni032E	COMBINING BREVE BELOW	•
0331	̱	uni0331	COMBINING MACRON BELOW	•
03C0	π	pi	GREEK SMALL LETTER PI	
1E0C	Ḍ	uni1E0C	LATIN CAPITAL LETTER D WITH DOT BELOW	•
1E0D	ḍ	uni1E0D	LATIN SMALL LETTER D WITH DOT BELOW	•
1E0E	Ḏ	uni1E0E	LATIN CAPITAL LETTER D WITH LINE BELOW	•
1E0F	ḏ	uni1E0F	LATIN SMALL LETTER D WITH LINE BELOW	•
1E20	Ḡ	uni1E20	LATIN CAPITAL LETTER G WITH MACRON	•
1E21	ḡ	uni1E21	LATIN SMALL LETTER G WITH MACRON	•
1E24	Ḥ	uni1E24	LATIN CAPITAL LETTER H WITH DOT BELOW	•
1E25	ḥ	uni1E25	LATIN SMALL LETTER H WITH DOT BELOW	•
1E2A	Ḫ	uni1E2A	LATIN CAPITAL LETTER H WITH BREVE BELOW	•
1E2B	ḫ	uni1E2B	LATIN SMALL LETTER H WITH BREVE BELOW	•
1E36	Ḷ	uni1E36	LATIN CAPITAL LETTER L WITH DOT BELOW	•
1E37	ḷ	uni1E37	LATIN SMALL LETTER L WITH DOT BELOW	•
1E38	Ḹ	uni1E38	LATIN CAPITAL LETTER L WITH DOT BELOW AND MACRON	•
1E39	ḹ	uni1E39	LATIN SMALL LETTER L WITH DOT BELOW AND MACRON	•
1E3A	Ḻ	uni1E3A	LATIN CAPITAL LETTER L WITH LINE BELOW	•
1E3B	ḻ	uni1E3B	LATIN SMALL LETTER L WITH LINE BELOW	•
1E42	Ṃ	uni1E42	LATIN CAPITAL LETTER M WITH DOT BELOW	•
1E43	ṃ	uni1E43	LATIN SMALL LETTER M WITH DOT BELOW	•
1E44	Ṅ	uni1E44	LATIN CAPITAL LETTER N WITH DOT ABOVE	•
1E45	ṅ	uni1E45	LATIN SMALL LETTER N WITH DOT ABOVE	•
1E46	Ṇ	uni1E46	LATIN CAPITAL LETTER N WITH DOT BELOW	•
1E47	ṇ	uni1E47	LATIN SMALL LETTER N WITH DOT BELOW	•
1E48	Ṉ	uni1E48	LATIN CAPITAL LETTER N WITH LINE BELOW	•
1E49	ṉ	uni1E49	LATIN SMALL LETTER N WITH LINE BELOW	•
1E5A	Ṛ	uni1E5A	LATIN CAPITAL LETTER R WITH DOT BELOW	•
1E5B	ṛ	uni1E5B	LATIN SMALL LETTER R WITH DOT BELOW	•
1E5C	Ṝ	uni1E5C	LATIN CAPITAL LETTER R WITH DOT BELOW AND MACRON	•
1E5D	ṝ	uni1E5D	LATIN SMALL LETTER R WITH DOT BELOW AND MACRON	•
1E5E	Ṟ	uni1E5E	LATIN CAPITAL LETTER R WITH LINE BELOW	•
1E5F	ṟ	uni1E5F	LATIN SMALL LETTER R WITH LINE BELOW	•
1E60	Ṡ	uni1E60	LATIN CAPITAL LETTER S WITH DOT ABOVE	•
1E61	ṡ	uni1E61	LATIN SMALL LETTER S WITH DOT ABOVE	•
1E62	Ṣ	uni1E62	LATIN CAPITAL LETTER S WITH DOT BELOW	•
1E63	ṣ	uni1E63	LATIN SMALL LETTER S WITH DOT BELOW	•
1E6C	Ṭ	uni1E6C	LATIN CAPITAL LETTER T WITH DOT BELOW	•
1E6D	ṭ	uni1E6D	LATIN SMALL LETTER T WITH DOT BELOW	•
1E6E	Ṯ	uni1E6E	LATIN CAPITAL LETTER T WITH LINE BELOW	•
1E6F	ṯ	uni1E6F	LATIN SMALL LETTER T WITH LINE BELOW	•
1E80	Ẁ	Wgrave	LATIN CAPITAL LETTER W WITH GRAVE	•
1E81	ẁ	wgrave	LATIN SMALL LETTER W WITH GRAVE	•
1E82	Ẃ	Wacute	LATIN CAPITAL LETTER W WITH ACUTE	•
1E83	ẃ	wacute	LATIN SMALL LETTER W WITH ACUTE	•
1E84	Ẅ	Wdieresis	LATIN CAPITAL LETTER W WITH DIAERESIS	•
1E85	ẅ	wdieresis	LATIN SMALL LETTER W WITH DIAERESIS	•
1E8E	Ẏ	uni1E8E	LATIN CAPITAL LETTER Y WITH DOT ABOVE	•
1E8F	ẏ	uni1E8F	LATIN SMALL LETTER Y WITH DOT ABOVE	•
1E92	Ẓ	uni1E92	LATIN CAPITAL LETTER Z WITH DOT BELOW	•
1E93	ẓ	uni1E93	LATIN SMALL LETTER Z WITH DOT BELOW	•
1E97	ẗ	uni1E97	LATIN SMALL LETTER T WITH DIAERESIS	•
1E9E	ẞ	uni1E9E	LATIN CAPITAL LETTER SHARP S	•
1EA0	Ạ	uni1EA0	LATIN CAPITAL LETTER A WITH DOT BELOW	•
1EA1	ạ	uni1EA1	LATIN SMALL LETTER A WITH DOT BELOW	•
1EA2	Ả	uni1EA2	LATIN CAPITAL LETTER A WITH HOOK ABOVE	•
1EA3	ả	uni1EA3	LATIN SMALL LETTER A WITH HOOK ABOVE	•
1EA4	Ấ	uni1EA4	LATIN CAPITAL LETTER A WITH CIRCUMFLEX AND ACUTE	•
1EA5	ấ	uni1EA5	LATIN SMALL LETTER A WITH CIRCUMFLEX AND ACUTE	•
1EA6	Ầ	uni1EA6	LATIN CAPITAL LETTER A WITH CIRCUMFLEX AND GRAVE	•
1EA7	ầ	uni1EA7	LATIN SMALL LETTER A WITH CIRCUMFLEX AND GRAVE	•
1EA8	Ẩ	uni1EA8	LATIN CAPITAL LETTER A WITH CIRCUMFLEX AND HOOK ABOVE	•
1EA9	ẩ	uni1EA9	LATIN SMALL LETTER A WITH CIRCUMFLEX AND HOOK ABOVE	•
1EAA	Ẫ	uni1EAA	LATIN CAPITAL LETTER A WITH CIRCUMFLEX AND TILDE	•
1EAB	ẫ	uni1EAB	LATIN SMALL LETTER A WITH CIRCUMFLEX AND TILDE	•
1EAC	Ậ	uni1EAC	LATIN CAPITAL LETTER A WITH CIRCUMFLEX AND DOT BELOW	•
1EAD	ậ	uni1EAD	LATIN SMALL LETTER A WITH CIRCUMFLEX AND DOT BELOW	•
1EAE	Ắ	uni1EAE	LATIN CAPITAL LETTER A WITH BREVE AND ACUTE	•
1EAF	ắ	uni1EAF	LATIN SMALL LETTER A WITH BREVE AND ACUTE	•
1EB0	Ằ	uni1EB0	LATIN CAPITAL LETTER A WITH BREVE AND GRAVE	•
1EB1	ằ	uni1EB1	LATIN SMALL LETTER A WITH BREVE AND GRAVE	•
1EB2	Ẳ	uni1EB2	LATIN CAPITAL LETTER A WITH BREVE AND HOOK ABOVE	•
1EB3	ẳ	uni1EB3	LATIN SMALL LETTER A WITH BREVE AND HOOK ABOVE	•
1EB4	Ẵ	uni1EB4	LATIN CAPITAL LETTER A WITH BREVE AND TILDE	•
1EB5	ẵ	uni1EB5	LATIN SMALL LETTER A WITH BREVE AND TILDE	•
1EB6	Ặ	uni1EB6	LATIN CAPITAL LETTER A WITH BREVE AND DOT BELOW	•
1EB7	ặ	uni1EB7	LATIN SMALL LETTER A WITH BREVE AND DOT BELOW	•
1EB8	Ẹ	uni1EB8	LATIN CAPITAL LETTER E WITH DOT BELOW	•
1EB9	ẹ	uni1EB9	LATIN SMALL LETTER E WITH DOT BELOW	•
1EBA	Ẻ	uni1EBA	LATIN CAPITAL LETTER E WITH HOOK ABOVE	•
1EBB	ẻ	uni1EBB	LATIN SMALL LETTER E WITH HOOK ABOVE	•
1EBC	Ẽ	uni1EBC	LATIN CAPITAL LETTER E WITH TILDE	•
1EBD	ẽ	uni1EBD	LATIN SMALL LETTER E WITH TILDE	•
1EBE	Ế	uni1EBE	LATIN CAPITAL LETTER E WITH CIRCUMFLEX AND ACUTE	•
1EBF	ế	uni1EBF	LATIN SMALL LETTER E WITH CIRCUMFLEX AND ACUTE	•
1EC0	Ề	uni1EC0	LATIN CAPITAL LETTER E WITH CIRCUMFLEX AND GRAVE	•
1EC1	ề	uni1EC1	LATIN SMALL LETTER E WITH CIRCUMFLEX AND GRAVE	•
1EC2	Ể	uni1EC2	LATIN CAPITAL LETTER E WITH CIRCUMFLEX AND HOOK ABOVE	•
1EC3	ể	uni1EC3	LATIN SMALL LETTER E WITH CIRCUMFLEX AND HOOK ABOVE	•
1EC4	Ễ	uni1EC4	LATIN CAPITAL LETTER E WITH CIRCUMFLEX AND TILDE	•
1EC5	ễ	uni1EC5	LATIN SMALL LETTER E WITH CIRCUMFLEX AND TILDE	•
1EC6	Ệ	uni1EC6	LATIN CAPITAL LETTER E WITH CIRCUMFLEX AND DOT BELOW	•
1EC7	ệ	uni1EC7	LATIN SMALL LETTER E WITH CIRCUMFLEX AND DOT BELOW	•
1EC8	Ỉ	uni1EC8	LATIN CAPITAL LETTER I WITH HOOK ABOVE	•
1EC9	ỉ	uni1EC9	LATIN SMALL LETTER I WITH HOOK ABOVE	•
1ECA	Ị	uni1ECA	LATIN CAPITAL LETTER I WITH DOT BELOW	•
1ECB	ị	uni1ECB	LATIN SMALL LETTER I WITH DOT BELOW	•
1ECC	Ọ	uni1ECC	LATIN CAPITAL LETTER O WITH DOT BELOW	•
1ECD	ọ	uni1ECD	LATIN SMALL LETTER O WITH DOT BELOW	•
1ECE	Ỏ	uni1ECE	LATIN CAPITAL LETTER O WITH HOOK ABOVE	•
1ECF	ỏ	uni1ECF	LATIN SMALL LETTER O WITH HOOK ABOVE	•
1ED0	Ố	uni1ED0	LATIN CAPITAL LETTER O WITH CIRCUMFLEX AND ACUTE	•
1ED1	ố	uni1ED1	LATIN SMALL LETTER O WITH CIRCUMFLEX AND ACUTE	•
1ED2	Ồ	uni1ED2	LATIN CAPITAL LETTER O WITH CIRCUMFLEX AND GRAVE	•
1ED3	ồ	uni1ED3	LATIN SMALL LETTER O WITH CIRCUMFLEX AND GRAVE	•
1ED4	Ổ	uni1ED4	LATIN CAPITAL LETTER O WITH CIRCUMFLEX AND HOOK ABOVE	•
1ED5	ổ	uni1ED5	LATIN SMALL LETTER O WITH CIRCUMFLEX AND HOOK ABOVE	•
1ED6	Ỗ	uni1ED6	LATIN CAPITAL LETTER O WITH CIRCUMFLEX AND TILDE	•
1ED7	ỗ	uni1ED7	LATIN SMALL LETTER O WITH CIRCUMFLEX AND TILDE	•
1ED8	Ộ	uni1ED8	LATIN CAPITAL LETTER O WITH CIRCUMFLEX AND DOT BELOW	•
1ED9	ộ	uni1ED9	LATIN SMALL LETTER O WITH CIRCUMFLEX AND DOT BELOW	•
1EDA	Ớ	uni1EDA	LATIN CAPITAL LETTER O WITH HORN AND ACUTE	•
1EDB	ớ	uni1EDB	LATIN SMALL LETTER O WITH HORN AND ACUTE	•
1EDC	Ờ	uni1EDC	LATIN CAPITAL LETTER O WITH HORN AND GRAVE	•
1EDD	ờ	uni1EDD	LATIN SMALL LETTER O WITH HORN AND GRAVE	•
1EDE	Ở	uni1EDE	LATIN CAPITAL LETTER O WITH HORN AND HOOK ABOVE	•
1EDF	ở	uni1EDF	LATIN SMALL LETTER O WITH HORN AND HOOK ABOVE	•
1EE0	Ỡ	uni1EE0	LATIN CAPITAL LETTER O WITH HORN AND TILDE	•
1EE1	ỡ	uni1EE1	LATIN SMALL LETTER O WITH HORN AND TILDE	•
1EE2	Ợ	uni1EE2	LATIN CAPITAL LETTER O WITH HORN AND DOT BELOW	•
1EE3	ợ	uni1EE3	LATIN SMALL LETTER O WITH HORN AND DOT BELOW	•
1EE4	Ụ	uni1EE4	LATIN CAPITAL LETTER U WITH DOT BELOW	•
1EE5	ụ	uni1EE5	LATIN SMALL LETTER U WITH DOT BELOW	•
1EE6	Ủ	uni1EE6	LATIN CAPITAL LETTER U WITH HOOK ABOVE	•
1EE7	ủ	uni1EE7	LATIN SMALL LETTER U WITH HOOK ABOVE	•
1EE8	Ứ	uni1EE8	LATIN CAPITAL LETTER U WITH HORN AND ACUTE	•
1EE9	ứ	uni1EE9	LATIN SMALL LETTER U WITH HORN AND ACUTE	•
1EEA	Ừ	uni1EEA	LATIN CAPITAL LETTER U WITH HORN AND GRAVE	•
1EEB	ừ	uni1EEB	LATIN SMALL LETTER U WITH HORN AND GRAVE	•
1EEC	Ử	uni1EEC	LATIN CAPITAL LETTER U WITH HORN AND HOOK ABOVE	•
1EED	ử	uni1EED	LATIN SMALL LETTER U WITH HORN AND HOOK ABOVE	•
1EEE	Ữ	uni1EEE	LATIN CAPITAL LETTER U WITH HORN AND TILDE	•
1EEF	ữ	uni1EEF	LATIN SMALL LETTER U WITH HORN AND TILDE	•
1EF0	Ự	uni1EF0	LATIN CAPITAL LETTER U WITH HORN AND DOT BELOW	•
1EF1	ự	uni1EF1	LATIN SMALL LETTER U WITH HORN AND DOT BELOW	•
1EF2	Ỳ	Ygrave	LATIN CAPITAL LETTER Y WITH GRAVE	•
1EF3	ỳ	ygrave	LATIN SMALL LETTER Y WITH GRAVE	•
1EF4	Ỵ	uni1EF4	LATIN CAPITAL LETTER Y WITH DOT BELOW	•
1EF5	ỵ	uni1EF5	LATIN SMALL LETTER Y WITH DOT BELOW	•
1EF6	Ỷ	uni1EF6	LATIN CAPITAL LETTER Y WITH HOOK ABOVE	•
1EF7	ỷ	uni1EF7	LATIN SMALL LETTER Y WITH HOOK ABOVE	•
1EF8	Ỹ	uni1EF8	LATIN CAPITAL LETTER Y WITH TILDE	•
1EF9	ỹ	uni1EF9	LATIN SMALL LETTER Y WITH TILDE	•
2007		uni2007	FIGURE SPACE	•
2010
uni2010	HYPHEN	•		
2012	‒	figuredash	FIGURE DASH	•
2013	–	endash	EN DASH	
2014	—	emdash	EM DASH	
2015	―	uni2015	HORIZONTAL BAR	•
2018	‘	quoteleft	LEFT SINGLE QUOTATION MARK	
2019	’	quoteright	RIGHT SINGLE QUOTATION MARK	
201A	‚	quotesinglbase	SINGLE LOW-9 QUOTATION MARK	
201C	“	quotedblleft	LEFT DOUBLE QUOTATION MARK	
201D	”	quotedblright	RIGHT DOUBLE QUOTATION MARK	
201E	„	quotedblbase	DOUBLE LOW-9 QUOTATION MARK	
2020	†	dagger	DAGGER	
2021	‡	daggerdbl	DOUBLE DAGGER	
2022	•	bullet	BULLET	
2026	...	ellipsis	HORIZONTAL ELLIPSIS	
2030	‰	perthousand	PER MILLE SIGN	
2032	′	uni2032	PRIME	•
2033	″	uni2033	DOUBLE PRIME	•
2039	‹	guilsinglleft	SINGLE LEFT-POINTING ANGLE QUOTATION MARK	
203A	›	guilsinglright	SINGLE RIGHT-POINTING ANGLE QUOTATION MARK	
2044	/	fraction	FRACTION SLASH	
2070	⁰	zero.superior	SUPERSCRIPT ZERO	•
2074	⁴	four.superior	SUPERSCRIPT FOUR	•
2075	⁵	five.superior	SUPERSCRIPT FIVE	•
2076	⁶	six.superior	SUPERSCRIPT SIX	•
2077	⁷	seven.superior	SUPERSCRIPT SEVEN	•
2078	⁸	eight.superior	SUPERSCRIPT EIGHT	•
2079	⁹	nine.superior	SUPERSCRIPT NINE	•
207D	⁽	parenleft.superior	SUPERSCRIPT LEFT PARENTHESIS	•
207E	⁾	parenright.superior	SUPERSCRIPT RIGHT PARENTHESIS	•
207F	ⁿ	n.superior	SUPERSCRIPT LATIN SMALL LETTER N	•
2080	₀	zero.inferior	SUBSCRIPT ZERO	•
2081	₁	one.inferior	SUBSCRIPT ONE	•
2082	₂	two.inferior	SUBSCRIPT TWO	•
2083	₃	three.inferior	SUBSCRIPT THREE	•
2084	₄	four.inferior	SUBSCRIPT FOUR	•
2085	₅	five.inferior	SUBSCRIPT FIVE	•
2086	₆	six.inferior	SUBSCRIPT SIX	•
2087	₇	seven.inferior	SUBSCRIPT SEVEN	•
2088	₈	eight.inferior	SUBSCRIPT EIGHT	•
2089	₉	nine.inferior	SUBSCRIPT NINE	•
208D	₍	parenleft.inferior	SUBSCRIPT LEFT PARENTHESIS	•
208E	₎	parenright.inferior	SUBSCRIPT RIGHT PARENTHESIS	•
20A1	₡	colonmonetary	COLON SIGN	•
20A4	₤	lira	LIRA SIGN	•
20A6	₦	uni20A6	NAIRA SIGN	•
20A7	₧	peseta	PESETA SIGN	•
20AB	₫	dong	DONG SIGN	•
20AC	€	Euro	EURO SIGN	
20B1	₱	uni20B1	PESO SIGN	•
20B2	₲	uni20B2	GUARANI SIGN	•
20B5	₵	uni20B5	CEDI SIGN	•
20B9	₹	uni20B9	INDIAN RUPEE SIGN	•
20BA	₺	uni20BA	TURKISH LIRA SIGN	
20BD	₽	uni20BD	RUBLE SIGN	
2113	ℓ	uni2113	SCRIPT SMALL L	
2117	℗	uni2117	SOUND RECORDING COPYRIGHT	•
2120	℠	uni2120	SERVICE MARK	•
2122	™	trademark	TRADE MARK SIGN	
2126	Ω	uni2126	OHM SIGN	
212E	℮	estimated	ESTIMATED SYMBOL	
2153	⅓	onethird	VULGAR FRACTION ONE THIRD	•
2154	⅔	twothirds	VULGAR FRACTION TWO THIRDS	•
215B	⅛	oneeighth	VULGAR FRACTION ONE EIGHTH	•
215C	⅜	threeeighths	VULGAR FRACTION THREE EIGHTHS	•
215D	⅝	fiveeighths	VULGAR FRACTION FIVE EIGHTHS	•
215E	⅞	seveneighths	VULGAR FRACTION SEVEN EIGHTHS	•
2190	←	uni2190	LEFTWARDS ARROW	•
2191	↑	arrowup	UPWARDS ARROW	•
2192	→	uni2192	RIGHTWARDS ARROW	•
2193	↓	arrowdown	DOWNWARDS ARROW	•
2202	∂	partialdiff	PARTIAL DIFFERENTIAL	
2206	∆	uni2206	INCREMENT	
220F	∏	product	N-ARY PRODUCT	
2211	∑	summation	N-ARY SUMMATION	
2212	−	minus	MINUS SIGN	
2215	∕	uni2215	DIVISION SLASH	
2219	∙	uni2219	BULLET OPERATOR	
221A	√	radical	SQUARE ROOT	
221E	∞	infinity	INFINITY	
222B	∫	integral	INTEGRAL	
2248	≈	approxequal	ALMOST EQUAL TO	
2260	≠	notequal	NOT EQUAL TO	
2264	≤	lessequal	LESS-THAN OR EQUAL TO	
2265	≥	greaterequal	GREATER-THAN OR EQUAL TO	
25A0	■	uni25A0	BLACK SQUARE	•
25B2	▲	uni25B2	BLACK UP-POINTING TRIANGLE	•
25B3	△	uni25B3	WHITE UP-POINTING TRIANGLE	•
25B6	▶	uni25B6	BLACK RIGHT-POINTING TRIANGLE	•
25B7	▷	uni25B7	WHITE RIGHT-POINTING TRIANGLE	•
25BC	▼	uni25BC	BLACK DOWN-POINTING TRIANGLE	•
25BD	▽	uni25BD	WHITE DOWN-POINTING TRIANGLE	•
25C0	◀	uni25C0	BLACK LEFT-POINTING TRIANGLE	•
25C1	◁	uni25C1	WHITE LEFT-POINTING TRIANGLE	•
25C6	◆	uni25C6	BLACK DIAMOND	•
25CA	◊	lozenge	LOZENGE	
FB01	ﬁ	fi	LATIN SMALL LIGATURE FI	
FB02	ﬂ	fl	LATIN SMALL LIGATURE FL	

== See also ==
- DIN 91379 Unicode subset for Europe
- Windows Glyph List 4
