= VT420 =

Computer terminal from Digital Equipment Corporation

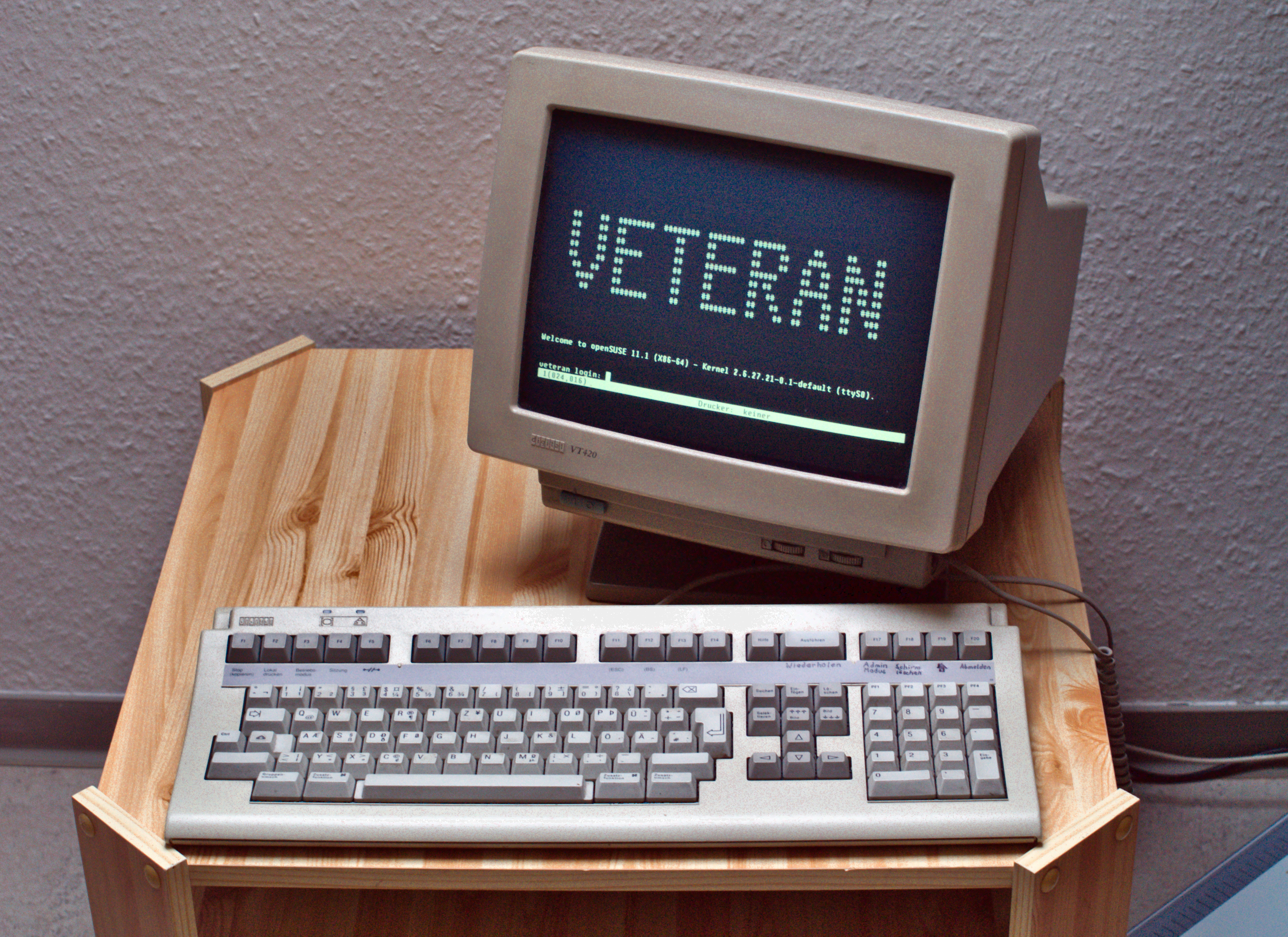
- DEC VT420
- Manufacturer: DEC
- Type: Computer terminal
- Released: 1990
- Display: 14" CRT 80x24 or 132x24 characters
- Input: Computer keyboard
- Connectivity: RS-232
- Predecessor: VT320
- Successor: VT520

The VT420 is an ANSI standard computer terminal introduced in 1990 by Digital Equipment Corporation (DEC). The 420 is the only model in the 400 series, replacing the VT320. There are no color or graphics-capable 400 series terminals; the VT340 remained in production for those requiring ReGIS and Sixel graphics and color support. The entire lineup of VT300s and VT420 was eventually replaced by the relatively unknown VT500 series starting in 1993.

== Description ==
The VT420 is essentially an updated VT320, adding the multi-session capabilities originally introduced on the VT330 and VT340.

Those two models include a system known as TD/SMP (Note: Known as SSU when referring to the terminal side of the same system.) which allows two sessions to be multiplexed over a single serial connection to a compatible terminal server. Alternately, the two sessions can be supported by separate serial connections on those models with multiple MMJ ports. Using either method, the VT330/340/420 can either show the two sessions behind each other, using a key sequence to flip back and forth, or split the screen horizontally to display the sessions one above the other, or vertically side-by-side.

The VT420 also added a number of more minor features. One was to add a number of PC character sets, allowing the terminal to be used with a variety of PC programs. Another allows the terminal to generate the proper character sequences to produce rectangular-area commands. For instance, one can select a rectangular area and fill it with a particular character, or blank it out. This is in addition to the terminal-side editing system introduced on the VT300s.

The VT420 has a total of 5 sets of 94 characters for normal VT operation, another 3 sets of 128 PC characters, and 1 set of 96 characters containing various graphics and math symbols. Like all models since the VT200 series, the user can also upload a custom character set of their own design using the Sixel system. Likewise, it also supports the National Replacement Character Set system, which swaps out single characters in 7-bit modes to allow basic changes like swapping the # for the £ for use on UK systems.

All DEC terminals that came after the VT100, including the VT420, are able to emulate their ancestors. The VT420 has VT100 and VT52 emulating modes.

The screen itself is a 14" flat CRT with a resolution of 800 (horizontal) by 400 (vertical) pixels. A variety of glyphs are available that provide 80 or 132 characters across, and 24, 36 or 48 lines of text vertically. The screen has room for 25 lines at normal font sizes, but the last line was normally used for status indications, like ⇪ Caps Lock. The MMJ ports can operate at speeds up to 38,400 bit/s, double that of the VT300s' maximum 19,200 bit/s.
