= VT1000 =

Monochrome X Window System computer terminal

The VT1000 was a monochrome X Window System computer terminal introduced by Digital Equipment Corporation (DEC) in April 1990. The VT1200 replaced the VT1000 later that year, consisting of a code update and a bump in the RAM from 1 to 2 MB. All of the VT1000 series communicated with their host computers over Ethernet, supporting TCP/IP as well as DEC's terminal-oriented Local Area Transport (LAT) protocol. They also included standard serial ports to allow basic terminal emulation, built into the ROM.

Apparently unhappy with these VT1000s, DEC released the VT1300 at the same time as the 1200. This was essentially a cut-down diskless version of the VAXstation 3100 Model 30, allowing the X Window System code to be downloaded from the host system. An upgraded version of the VT1300 that allowed the host to download programs to the terminal to run them locally was the VTX2000, a concept DEC called an "X workstation".

== History ==
=== Concept ===
The VT1000 family developed out of a 1987 study carried out by DEC's VIPS group. They studied the use of existing graphics-capable workstations, and found that the vast majority of their users were simply using the workstation to maintain several terminal sessions to a host computer. This was wasting the majority of the power of the workstation, which cost tens of thousands of dollars. This led to a 1987 project to design a system more suitable to the tasks the users were actually doing, bringing standardized graphics to the users that might actually be used, and lowering the hardware complexity so a basic terminal user might consider buying one.

=== Development ===
The team rejected using one of their single-chip VAX processors due to high cost of implementation. The Motorola 68000 was both inexpensive and powerful, but they did not have support for cross-compilers and other development support systems on VMS, so those would have to be written. Considering this, the team ultimately chose the Texas Instruments TMS34010, a design that combines a 32-bit CPU with additional instructions for handling common 2D graphics tasks and bit handling. The TMS34010 blends the roles of CPU and GPU, lowering the cost of implementing a complete graphical terminal.

Having experimented with an X Server on the VAXstation 2000, the team concluded that serial links would not be fast enough to support X Windows, and made the decision to equip the design with Ethernet as its primary communications system. Studying the system throughput as a whole, they estimated that the resulting system would not be terribly fast, but would be faster than an X Server running on the VAXstation 2000, which was considered barely usable. Some consideration was given to equipping it with both the TMS34010 to handle graphics and a 68000 for other tasks, but the team was unable to find a way to balance the loads so that one or the other processor didn't end up underutilized. A potential upgrade to the upcoming TMS34020 seemed more promising.

The team decided early on to use a custom operating system developed for another project, and debated whether to include that in ROM or have the code be downloaded from the host through a boot mechanism. Using ROM would eliminate the long network boot process, but also mean that minor fixes and upgrades would be difficult. For performance reasons, they chose to include the OS on ROM, using a small plug-in card that could be swapped out. Other parts of the system, like the fonts, are downloaded from the host to save room in the ROM. This uses a custom networking mechanism and required a host machine running a server.

This decision had a number of spin-off effects. It was desirable to have the system be able to do local setup and terminal emulation even when not connected to a host computer, which led to the requirement for a basic user interface similar to BIOS that allowed it to be set up and handle connections to hosts using X windows. In X windows, this requires the machine to have both the X Server, the software that draws the display, as well as the X Client, an application calling the Xlib code to send drawing commands to the server. (Note: The terms client and server under X terminology are reversed from normal usage: the server normally runs on the end-user machine, which is normally referred to as the client in other cases.) DEC had such a system as part of their DECwindows system, but this was tightly tied to VMS, requiring a port of MIT's Xlib to the TMS34020 platform. A terminal emulator providing support for VT52, VT100, VT220 and VT320 terminals was included in the ROM, using the local window manager for display.

=== VT1300 ===
While the original design was being worked on, the team had to constantly tune the software for maximum performance. This led to continual ROM updates, causing considerable problems. This led to increasing interest in a RAM-based machine that booted from the network, reversing their earlier decision. In 1989 development along these lines started using the VAXstation 3100 with the hard drive and other components removed, running the VAXELN operating system and EWS (X11 for VAXELN). As the system could only be used with a host computer, there was no local user interface. Implementing this version of the system required considerably more hardware and expense, so the decision was made to make this a color-only model, in comparison to the earlier models which were monochrome.

== Description ==
The VT1000 and VT1200 was packaged in a pizza box case with the monitor normally sitting on top and an LK400 series keyboard connected to it using a coiled cord and 4-pin modular connector. The three-button mouse was roughly puck-shaped, not unlike the original iMac mouse, and used a custom 7-pin round connector. The back panel included a coax connector for the monitor, mouse and keyboard ports, a Modified Modular Jack (MMJ) serial port for a printer, another MMJ serial port for host connections, and a thinwire Ethernet connector. It also included AC in and out connectors, the latter used to connect the monitor, allowing it to be turned on and off with the terminal using a single switch located on the side of the case beside the power connectors. The system supported a number of monochrome monitors, selected using a rotary switch beside the monitor port.

In addition to X Window support, the VT1000 and VT1200 could also emulate DEC's previous text terminals in individual windows, including support for the VT52, VT100, VT220 and VT320. The basic model shipped with a 15-inch CRT monitor and cost $2,895, but could be upgraded to a 19-inch display for an additional $700, or a 19-inch flat-screen electroluminescent display for an additional $11,100. All of the displays were 1024x864 resolution. They shipped with 1 MB of RAM, but could be upgraded to 4 MB for $600 per megabyte. The VT1000 was replaced by the VT1200 in the fall of 1991. This was essentially the same machine with a code upgrade.

The VT1300 was packaged into a much larger case, about the size of a contemporary full-sized IBM PC although somewhat shorter vertically. It was released at $7,495 with 9 MB of RAM and a 19-inch color monitor.
