= Mrxvt =

Terminal emulator

mrxvt
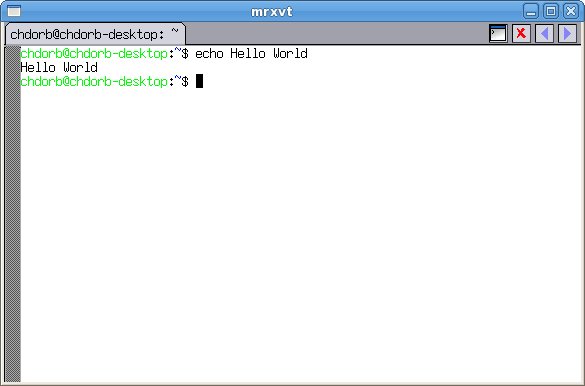
- Hello world, in mrxvt
- Stable release: 0.5.4 / September 10, 2008; 18 years ago
- Written in: C
- Type: Terminal emulator
- License: GPL-2.0-or-later
- Website: sourceforge.net/projects/materm/

The mrxvt program is a terminal emulator for X Window System. It provides DEC VT102 compatible terminals.

mrxvt is based on rxvt version 2.7.11 CVS (in 2004), and features most of functionality of rxvt. Unlike rxvt, it provides multiple tabs. Like rxvt, mrxvt aims to be light, fast, flexible and does not depend on desktop environments like GNOME or KDE.

The primary features of mrxvt include (but are not limited to) multiple tabs, dynamically changeable tab titles, customizable command for each tab, input broadcasting, fast pseudo-transparency with tinting, user supplied background images (XPM, JPEG, PNG), off-focus fading, text shadow, multiple style (NeXT, Rxvt, Xterm, SGI, Plain) scrollbars, XIM, multi-language support (Chinese, Korean, Japanese), Freetype font and logging.

mrxvt does not have Unicode support, though a Unicode version was in development.

The latest released version of mrxvt, which was released in 2008, is vulnerable to CVE-2017-7483, which can cause the terminal to crash. This vulnerability led to mrxvt being removed from the OpenBSD ports collection.

== See also ==
- List of terminal emulators
