= Rxvt =

Terminal emulator for the X Window System

rxvt
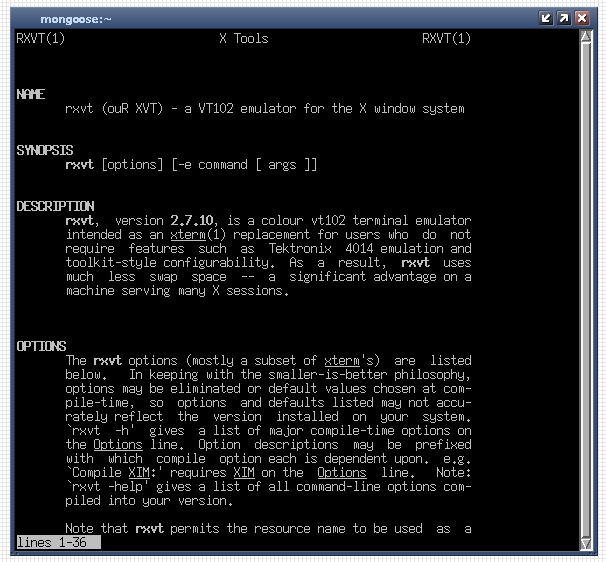
- Vanilla rxvt displaying the rxvt man page
- Original author(s): Rob Nation
- Developer(s): rxvt project
- Stable release: 2.6.4 / November 1, 2001; 23 years ago
- Preview release: 2.7.10 / March 26, 2003; 21 years ago
- Type: Terminal emulator
- License: GPL-2.0-or-later
- Website: rxvt.net

Rxvt (acronym for our extended virtual terminal) is a terminal emulator for the X Window System, and in the form of a Cygwin port, for Windows.

== History ==
Rxvt was originally written by Rob Nation and later extensively modified by Mark Olesen, who took over maintenance for several years. It is intended to be a slimmed-down alternate for xterm, omitting some of its little-used features, like Tektronix 4014 emulation and toolkit-style configurability. The latter refers to the Xt resource mechanism, e.g., for binding keys. Rxvt is an extended version of the older xvt terminal emulator by John Bovey of the University of Kent.

The name originally stood for "Rob's xvt" (with XVT stands for 'X Virtual Terminal'), but was later re-dubbed "our xvt" (pronounced like the letters r-x-v-t).

== Features ==
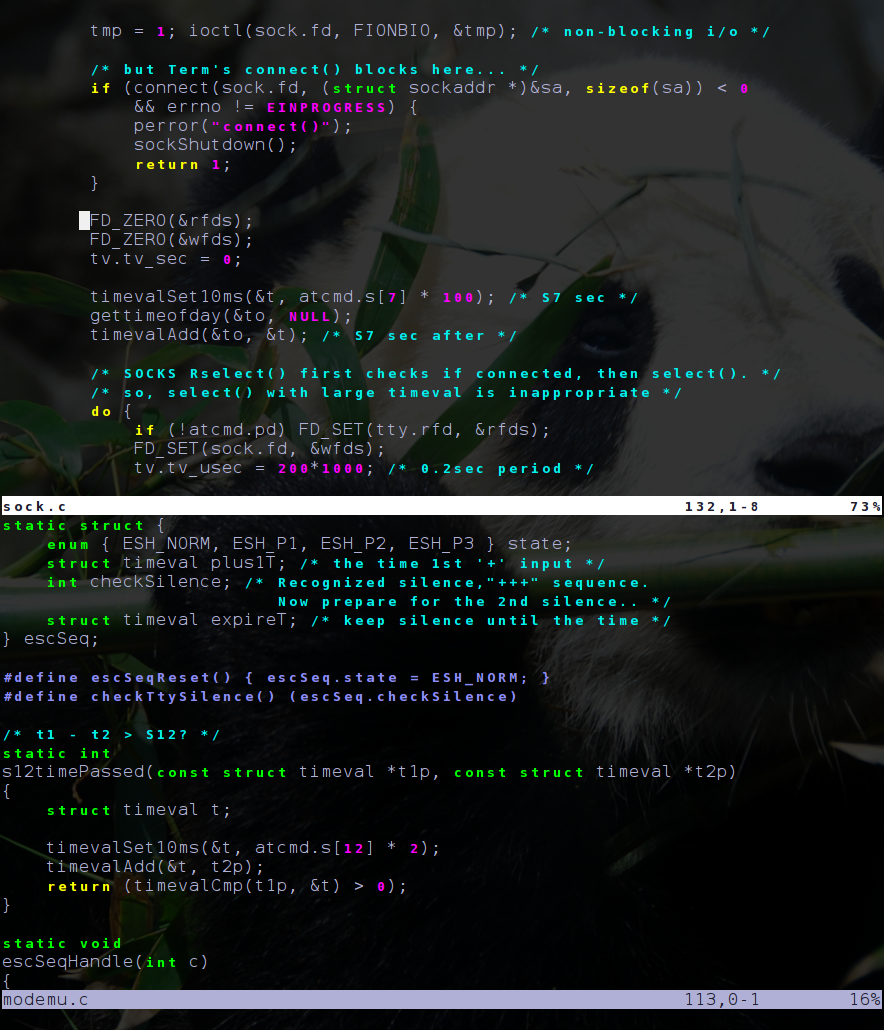
rxvt-unicode with translucency and a truetype mono font

Aside from features such as those controlled by resource files, rxvt's terminal emulation differs from xterm in two important ways:

- It emulates a VT102, rather than a VT220. That means that it handles 8-bit data differently, does not implement the C1 controls that xterm does. xterm does implement a switch "-k8" to suppress that functionality; rxvt does not provide an option to emulate a VT220.
- The strings sent for function keys are different. xterm sends strings that are encoded using the same rules as the ANSI/ISO escape sequences. Rxvt's do not, though they provide comparable flexibility in this area.

Newer versions of rxvt have primitive support for pseudo-transparency.

The rxvt distribution also includes an analog clock program called rclock. Very old distributions included a copy of vttest, but dropped that in 1996 with version 2.18.

== Forks ==
- aterm (from rxvt 2.4.8) created for use with the AfterStep window manager (no longer maintained)
- Eterm (from rxvt 2.21) created for use with Enlightenment
- mrxvt (from rxvt 2.7.11) created for multiple tabs and additional features (latest version released in 2008-09-10)
- urxvt (rxvt-unicode) (from rxvt 2.7.11)
- Wterm, designed for NeXTSTEP style window managers such as Window Maker

== See also ==
- List of terminal emulators
