= ITerm2 =

Open-source macOS terminal emulator

iTerm2
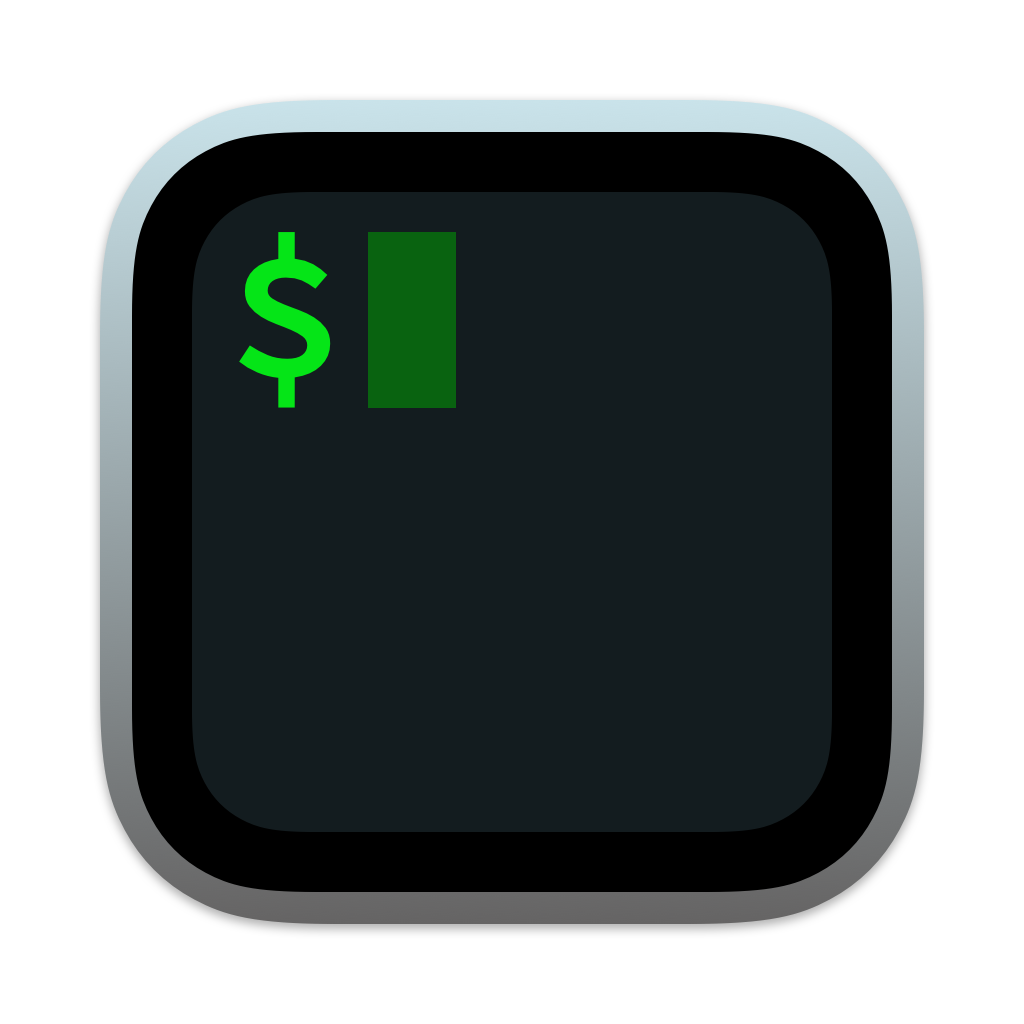

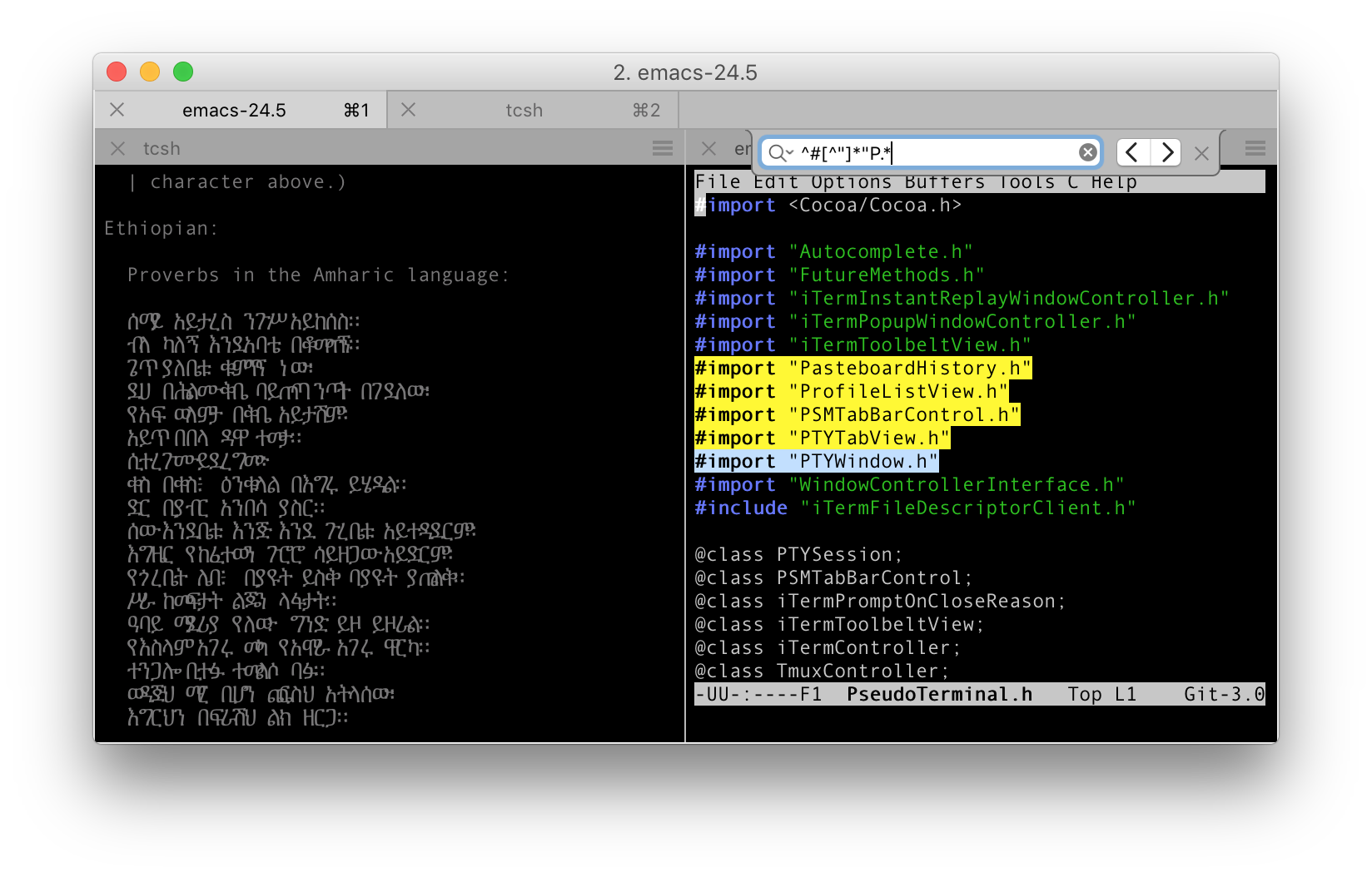
- iTerm2 screenshot showing multiple tabs, split panes, regular expression search highlighting, and UTF-8 support.
- Developer: George Nachman
- Stable release: 3.7.0 / September 8, 2026; 1 day ago
- Operating system: macOS
- Type: Terminal emulator
- License: GPL-2.0-or-later
- Website: www.iterm2.com
- Repository: github.com/gnachman/iTerm2

iTerm2 is a free and open-source terminal emulator for macOS, licensed under GPL-2.0-or-later. It was derived from and has mostly supplanted the earlier "iTerm" application.

iTerm2 supports operating system features such as window transparency, full-screen mode, split panes, Exposé Tabs, Growl notifications, and standard keyboard shortcuts. Other features include customizable profiles, Instant Replay of past terminal input/output, a Toolbelt showing running jobs and a command history, the ability to open when a key combination is pressed, and autocomplete.

== History ==
A Mozilla-sponsored 2019 code audit found one serious security vulnerability in iTerm2's tmux integration, which developer George Nachman fixed in an update.

== Reception ==
Software engineer Mike Rourke called it an "excellent [...] more full-featured Terminal" than Apple's built-in Terminal app. iTerm2 is recommended in several programming books, with engineer Jo Rhett and Mozilla's Tom Ritter describing it as one of the most popular terminal emulators. Developer Mark McDonnel noted its additional features but criticized it for being less ubiquitous than tmux by lacking a Linux version.

== See also ==
- List of terminal emulators
