= VT520 =

Computer terminal from Digital Equipment Corporation

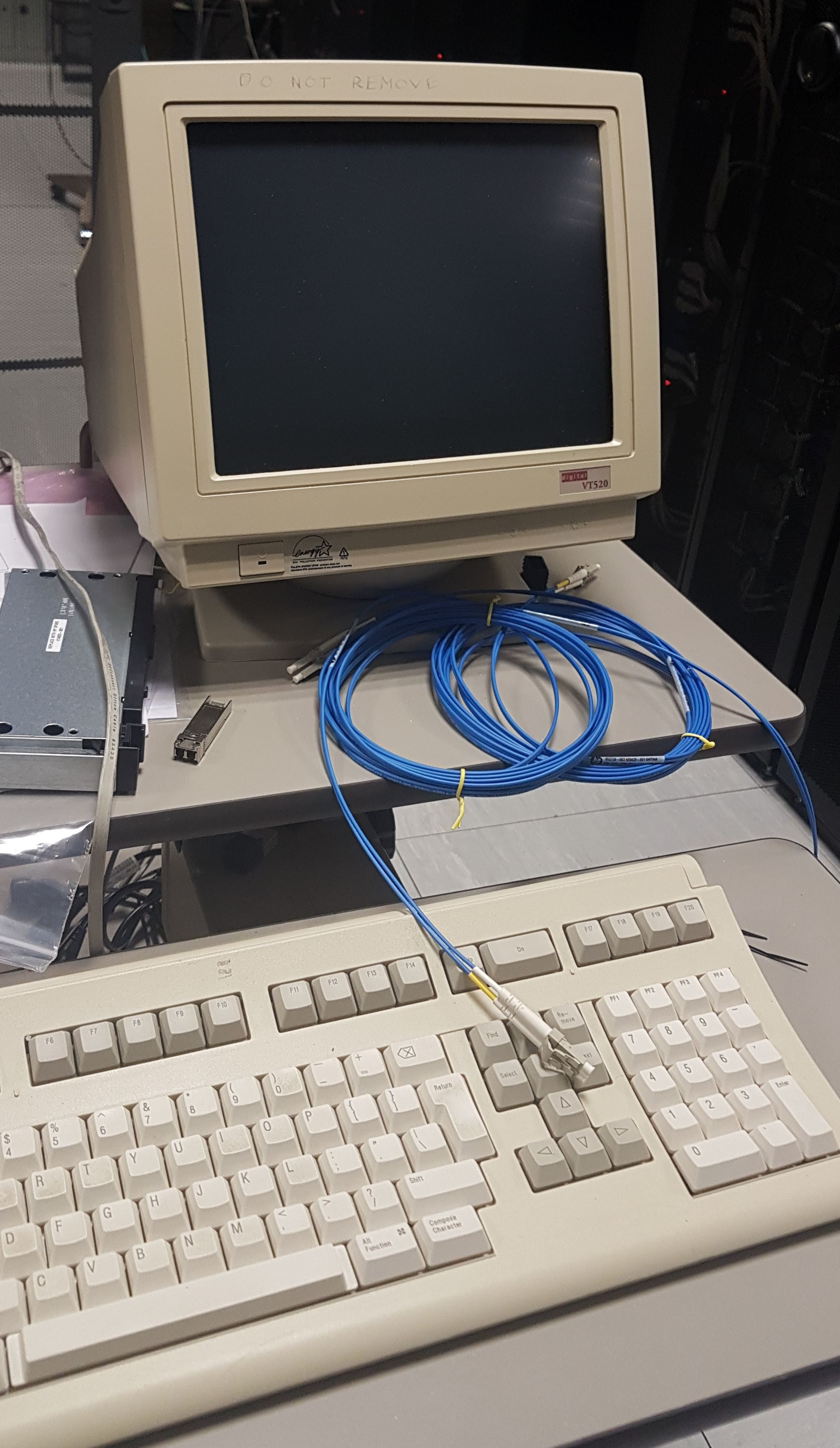
- Original DEC VT520, still in daily use in 2019 on an RS232 serial console crash cart in a data center.
- Manufacturer: DEC
- Type: Computer terminal
- Released: September 1993
- Display: 14" CRT 80x24 or 132x24 characters
- Input: Computer keyboard
- Connectivity: RS-232
- Predecessor: VT420

The VT520 is an ANSI standard computer terminal introduced by Digital Equipment Corporation (DEC) in 1993 and 1994. The VT520 is a multi-session monochrome text-only terminal with a built-in 14" monitor. The VT510 was a single-session version, while the VT525 added color support and used a separate external monitor.

The VT500s replaced all existing models of DEC's VT line, which at that time consisted of just the VT420 text and VT340 graphics terminals. It was introduced in an era when the market was being flooded by low-cost IBM PC clones which could perform the same functions using a terminal emulator while also running other software. DEC introduced the VT500s only a short time before selling off their entire terminal division in August 1995. This brought the VT series to a close, after a total of about six million terminals had been sold.

The VT520 was available from Boundless Technologies until the company went defunct in 2003.

== Description ==
By the mid-1990s the price of low-end PCs was rapidly falling to under $1000. When equipped with a terminal emulator, these machines could perform all the functions of a DEC terminal, as well as running software locally. The terminal market began to crash, but remained important to DEC's core minicomputer business. DEC responded by introducing the VT500 series as simplified and lower-cost options to the existing VT420 and VT340. The new 500s were text-only but they added an RS-232C serial port and a Centronics port as well as a PS/2 keyboard connector which made them easier to integrate into a mixed computing environment. They also had two DEC proprietary MMJ serial connectors and a DEC proprietary keyboard port like their predecessors.

The VT510 was introduced in 1993 as an all-in-one unit with a built-in 14" display. The VT520 was similar but supported up to 4 sessions using a system known as TD/SMP. (Note: On the terminals, TD/SMP was known as SSU.) The later VT525 color terminal dispensed with the integrated monitor as well, packaging the system into a pizza box case with an SVGA port for connection to an external user-supplied monitor.

Like all models of the VT series, the VT500's primary purpose is to act as an ANSI standard terminal. The VT510 supported only a single session, while the 520 and 525 supported up to four sessions, up from two in earlier VTs. The user can flip between the sessions using control sequences on the keyboard (typically F4), or display multiple sessions at the same time by splitting the screen horizontally or vertically. All models have multiple character sets in ROM, supporting DEC, international and PC characters. They can also replace any of these by downloading custom characters using sixels, and perform single-character swaps using the National Replacement Character Set, swapping $ with £ for use with UK keyboards for instance.

The speed of the serial ports was increased to 115.2 kbit/s, up from 38.4 kbit/s on the VT300s. Any one of the serial ports could support two sessions using TD/SMP. Like earlier models of the VT line, the 500s could be put into modes emulating the VT100 and VT52, but added a wide variety of other emulations for Wyse, ADDS, TeleVideo and other terminals. The 500s also directly supported ANSI commands for color, like the Wyse, in addition to the custom escape sequences used for color support on previous VT models.

Another new feature was the inclusion of a set of desk accessories running on the terminal's CPU. These included a calculator, alarm clock, calendar, and a character set viewer.

Terminal emulator specifications may refer to VT500 instead of VT510, VT520 and VT525 in the statements about their compatibility.
