= Pseudoterminal =

Pair of pseudo-device endpoints

Pseudoterminals as they are used by the script Unix command that records user's input for replaying it later

In some operating systems, including Unix-like systems, a pseudoterminal, pseudotty, or PTY is a pair of pseudo-device endpoints (files) which establish an asynchronous, bidirectional communication (IPC) channel (with two ports) between two or more processes.

One pseudo-device in the pair, the master, provides means by which a terminal emulator or remote login server (e.g. a Telnet, rlogin, or Secure Shell server) process controls the slave. The other pseudo-device, the slave, emulates a hardware serial port device, and is used by terminal-oriented programs such as shells (e.g. bash) as a processes to read/write data back from/to master endpoint. PTYs are similar to bidirectional pipes.

Devpts is a Linux kernel virtual file system containing pseudoterminal devices.

Linux implementation is based on System V-style terminals (commonly referred as UNIX 98 pseudoterminals) and provides POSIX and the Single Unix Specification API in the form of a posix_openpt() function since 1998.

== History ==
Pseudoterminals were present in the DEC PDP-6 Timesharing Monitor at least as early as 1967, and were used to implement batch processing. They are described in the documentation for the succeeding TOPS-10 on the PDP-10. Some other DEC operating systems also had PTYs, including RSTS/E for the PDP-11, as did the third-party TENEX operating system for the PDP-10.

Implementations of Unix pseudo terminals date back to the modifications that RAND and BBN made to a 6th Edition in the late 1970s to support remote access over a network. Modern Unix pseudoterminals originated in 1983 during the development of Eighth Edition Unix and were based on a similar feature in TENEX. They were part of the 4.3BSD-Reno, with a rather cumbersome openpty() interface defined for use.

AT&T's System V included support for pseudoterminals as a driver in their STREAMS device model, along with the pseudoterminal multiplexer (/dev/ptmx). This later evolved to become the Unix98 style of PTYs.

Pseudoterminals have been standardized by the Single UNIX Specification (maintained by the Austin Group) since 2004 (Issue 6). From Issue 8 (2024) the description adopts inclusive language by replacing the word master with manager and the word slave with subsidiary (defect 1466).

== Books ==
The Linux Programming Interface from 2010 contains an entire chapter (chapter 64 "Pseudoterminals" p1375–1399.) explaining pseudoterminals. Then there is another one, Chapter 62 "Terminals", dedicated to terminals.

The Windows Console was extended to have a PTY interface called ConPTY in 2018.

== Applications ==
The role of the terminal emulator process is:

- to interact with the user,
- to feed text input to the master pseudo-device for use by the shell (such as bash), which is connected to the slave pseudo-device,
- to read text output from the master pseudo-device and show it to the user.

The terminal emulator process must also handle terminal control commands, e.g., for resizing the screen. Widely used terminal emulator programs include xterm, GNOME Terminal, Konsole, and Terminal.

Remote login servers such as Secure Shell and Telnet servers play the same role but communicate with a remote user instead of a local one.

Screen and Tmux are used to add a session context to a pseudoterminal, making for a much more robust and versatile solution. For example, each provides terminal persistence, allowing a user to disconnect from one computer and then connect later from another computer.

== Variants ==
In the BSD PTY system, the slave device file, which generally has a name of the form /dev/tty[p-za-e][0-9a-f], supports all system calls applicable to text terminal devices. Thus it supports login sessions. The master device file, which generally has a name of the form /dev/pty[p-za-e][0-9a-f], is the endpoint for communication with the terminal emulator.

With the BSD [p-za-e] naming scheme, there can be at most 256 tty pairs. Also, finding the first free pty master can introduce a race condition unless a locking scheme is adopted. For that reason, some BSD operating systems, such as FreeBSD, OpenBSD, and DragonFly BSD, and the BSD-based macOS, have added support for Unix98 PTYs, whose naming system does not limit the number of pseudo-terminals, and access to which occurs without danger of race conditions. /dev/ptmx is the "pseudo-terminal master multiplexer". Opening it returns a file descriptor of a master node and causes an associated slave node /dev/pts/N to be created.

== See also ==
- List of Unix commands
