= MMJ =

MMJ may refer to:

- Medical marijuana, cannabis prescribed by physicians for their patients
- MMJ, Filipino singing duo under the label Star Music
- Modified Modular Jack, a six-pin modular connector used by Digital Equipment Corporation on their computers and peripherals.
- More More Jump, a character group in Hatsune Miku: Colorful Stage!
- Moscow Mathematical Journal, a quarterly international academic journal published by the Independent University of Moscow
- Multimedia journalism
- My Morning Jacket, an American rock band
- The IATA airport code of Matsumoto Airport in Matsumoto, Nagano Prefecture, Japan
- The ISO 639-3 identifier code for the Majhwar language
