= Pty =

Pty or PTY may refer to:

- Proprietary company, a business structure in Australia and South Africa
- Tocumen International Airport (IATA airport code), Panama
- Pseudoterminal, a virtual device class in Unix operating systems
- Programme Type, in the FM broadcast Radio Data System
