= Twin (windowing system) =

- Developer: Massimiliano Ghilardi
- Stable release: 1.0.0 / January 3, 2026; 4 months ago
- Operating system: Unix-like
- Type: Windowing system
- License: GPL
- Website: GitHub project
- Repository: github.com/cosmos72/twin

Twin (acronym for "Textmode WINdow") is a windowing environment with mouse support, window manager, terminal emulator and networked clients, all inside a text mode display. Twin is tested on Linux (x86, PowerPC/Power ISA, DEC Alpha, SPARC), FreeBSD, and macOS.

== History ==
Massimiliano Ghilardi started writing Twin in 1993 as his first big program for MS-DOS immediately after having learned the C programming language. He soon abandoned it, because of the lack of support for multitasking. In late 1999, he resurrected twin by porting it to Linux.

== Usage ==
The terminal emulator Eterm has an interface layer named Escreen for interoperating with the terminal multiplexers GNU Screen or Twin. This allows Eterm to support multiple sub-shell sessions within a single window. This feature works similarly to the "tabbed" sessions offered by terminal emulators such as Konsole or GNOME Terminal. However, being an interface to existing software, Escreen has the advantage of providing additional capabilities like multiple regions per display, detach/reattach capability, seamless remote session support, firewall support, and more.

Twin supports multiple displays:

1. plain text computer terminals (any termcap/ncurses compatible terminal, the virtual console, Twin's own terminal emulator)
2. X11, where it can be used as a multi-window Xterm
3. itself (it is possible to display a Twin on, or "inside", another Twin)
4. twdisplay, a general network-transparent display client, used to attach/detach more displays "on the fly".

== See also ==
- Text user interface
- General Graphics Interface
- DESQview, accomplished a similar goal under MS-DOS
