= AlphaCom =

Computer terminal emulator

- Developer(s): OmniCom Technologies
- Initial release: 1999; 26 years ago
- Stable release: 9.0 / 2015
- Platform: Windows, OS X
- Type: Terminal emulator
- License: Proprietary
- Website: OmniCom Technologies

AlphaCom is a commercial SSH, Telnet and RS-232/modem client and terminal emulator by OmniCom Technologies. It is a Windows product but has been known to also run on Linux via emulation.

== History ==
AlphaCom is a GUI-based RS-232/modem, Telnet and SSH client and terminal emulator. The earliest known version was released in 1999. It was previously part of a line of networking software which included a remote desktop client called winShadow, a Telnet server called AlphaServ, and a remote printing product called AlphaLPD. The company now offers only AlphaCom and AlphaLPD. All of the above are commercialware.

== Features ==
- Wyse 50/50+, Wyse 60, SCO ANSI, Linux, IBM 3151, ANSI, VT220, VT102, VT100, VT52 emulations
- International keyboard and character set
- Built-in utilities includes file transfer, host look-up, ping, traceroute, FTP, time client and network scanner

OmniCom Technologies has further information on their web site.

== Compatibility ==
AlphaCom runs on Windows XP, Windows Vista, Windows 7, Windows 8, Windows 10 and Windows 11. It also runs on the Windows Server series of operating systems. An experimental version for macOS was made available in January 2016.

== Popularity ==
AlphaCom is a popular choice among system and network administrators. A free trial of AlphaCom is available. The trial version is valid for 30 days.

== See also ==
- List of terminal emulators
