= Dynamically Redefined Character Set =

The Dynamically Redefined Character Set, or DRCS for short, was a feature of Digital Equipment Corporation's smart terminals starting with the VT200 series in 1983. DRCS added a RAM buffer where new glyphs could be uploaded from the host system using the Sixel data format.
