= MacWise =

MacWise is a terminal emulator for the Apple Macintosh, written by Carnation Software and first released in 1996. It is a derivative of MacToPic, an earlier terminal emulator developed by Carnation Software first released in 1989.

MacToPic was developed by Rich Love. The original version emulates terminals including the ADDS Viewpoint, Wyse 50, VT100, and McDonnell Douglas Prism. As the name suggests, the software was originally optimized for communicating with host computers running the Pick operating system. MacToPic Plus was released in May 1990 and added the ability to display monochrome graphics programmed using Pick Basic. Later versions were more generalized to other operating systems such as Unix and VMark's UniVerse and added features such as color graphics and Communications ToolBox and QuickTime integration. In early 1996, Carnation released MacWise, a simplified terminal emulator for the Macintosh, selling alongside MacToPic. It supported the ADDS Viewpoint, McDonnell Douglas Prism, VT100, and Wyse 50 and 60 terminals. Version 10 of MacWise was released in May 2002 and added support for the Wyse 370 (and Esprit III by extension), VT220, and TeleVideo 925 terminals. In November 2002, Love merged the MacToPic and MacWise codebases, updated it for Mac OS X, and released it as MacWise. A version for OS X Mountain Lion appeared in 2012.

MacWise was re-written in 2019 as a 64-bit Macintosh application.
