= Terminal (macOS) =

Default macOS terminal emulator

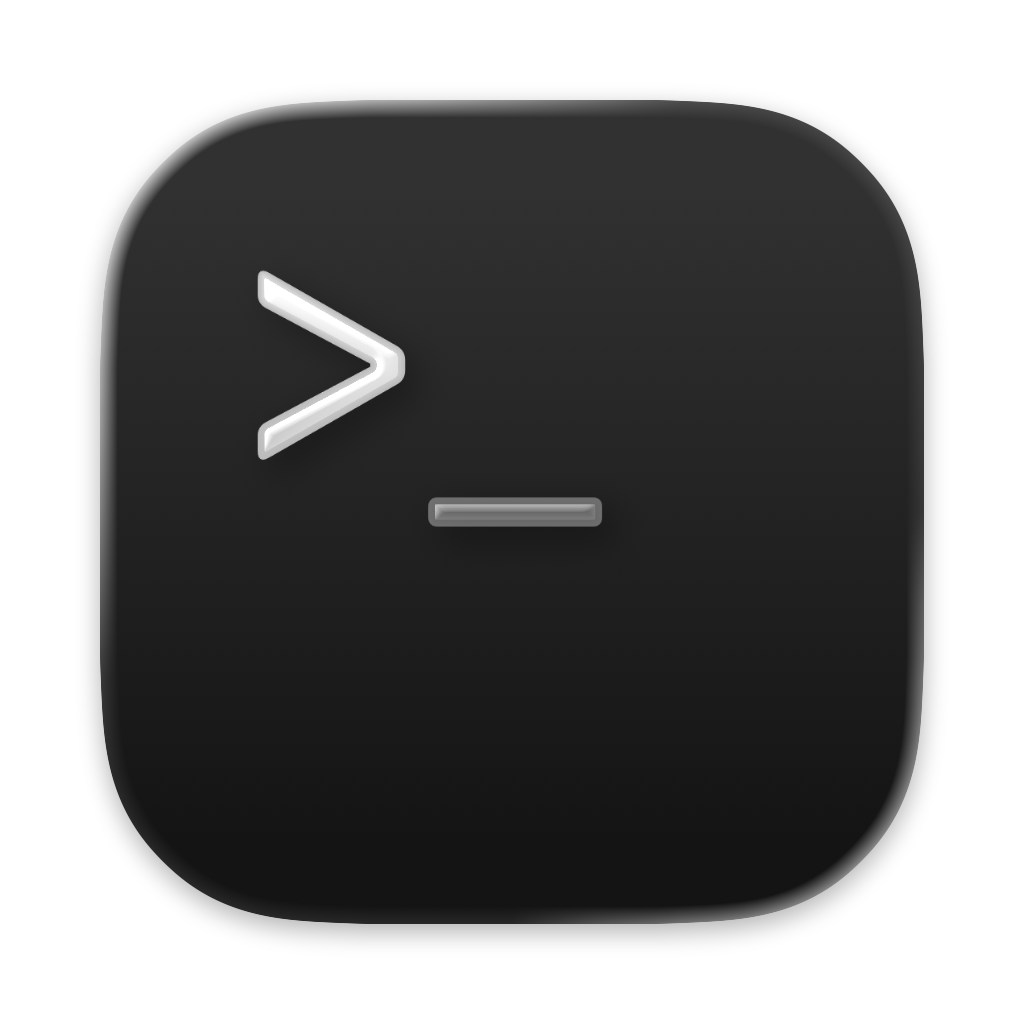

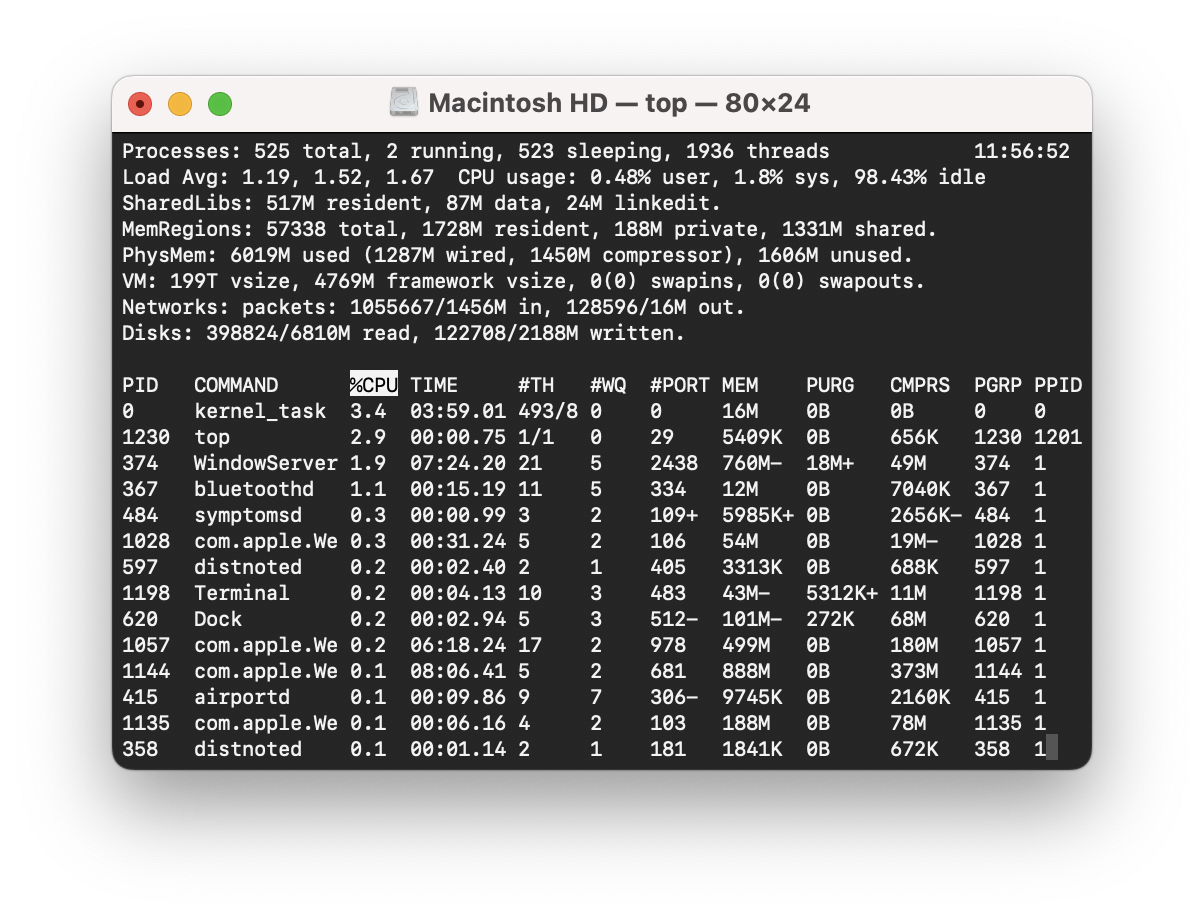
- Terminal 2.14 running the top program under macOS Sonoma
- Developer: Apple Inc.
- Initial release: March 27, 2001; 25 years ago
- Stable release: 2.15 (464) / September 15, 2025; 7 months ago
- Written in: Objective-C
- Operating system: macOS
- Platform: Current: ARM64, x86-64; Former: IA-32, PowerPC
- Type: Terminal emulator
- License: Proprietary
- Website: support.apple.com/guide/terminal/welcome/mac

Terminal is the terminal emulator included in the macOS operating system by Apple. Terminal originated in NeXTSTEP and OPENSTEP, the predecessor operating systems of macOS.

As a terminal emulator, the application provides text-based access to the operating system, in contrast to the mostly graphical nature of the user experience of macOS, by providing a command-line interface to the operating system when used in conjunction with a Unix shell, such as zsh (the default interactive shell since macOS Catalina). The user can choose other shells available with macOS, such as the KornShell, tcsh, and bash.

The preferences dialog for Terminal.app in OS X 10.8 (Mountain Lion) and later offers choices for values of the TERM environment variable. Available options are ansi, dtterm, nsterm, rxvt, vt52, vt100, vt102, xterm, xterm-16color and xterm-256color, which differ from the OS X 10.5 (Leopard) choices by dropping the xterm-color and adding xterm-16color and xterm-256color. These settings do not alter the operation of Terminal, and the xterm settings do not match the behavior of xterm.

Terminal includes several features that specifically access macOS APIs and features, such as the command mdfind which is the terminal interface of Spotlight. Terminal offers a range of profiles that include custom font and coloring options, and custom profiles can be created as well.

== See also ==
- List of terminal emulators
