= Vttest =

Application for feature demonstration of terminals or terminal emulators

vttest
- Original author: Per Lindberg
- Developer: Thomas Dickey
- Initial release: 1986; 40 years ago
- Stable release: 20200420 / April 20, 2020; 6 years ago
- Operating system: Cross-platform
- Type: Utility software
- License: MIT License
- Website: invisible-island.net/vttest/
- Repository: invisible-mirror.net/archives/vttest/

Example showing VTTEST locking-shifts test for xterm running as a VT220.

Example showing VTTEST displaying doublesize characters in xterm.

Vttest is an application that demonstrates various features of the VT100 and related terminals, or emulations thereof, such as xterm. The program was originally written in 1986 by Per Lindberg. It has been maintained and extended since 1996 by Thomas Dickey, to test and demonstrate features of xterm.

The newer version has always been distributed as a separate program; older versions have been bundled with other software, e.g., terminal emulators such as Rxvt, Konsole, and the FreeBSD PCVT.

Perhaps prompted by the "scoresheet" presented by the developers of Kermit, some other developers of terminal emulators have asserted that their product achieves a given rating on the "VTTEST Score Card". However, no independent verification of any of those claims exists.
