= Text mode =

Computer display mode based on characters

Text mode is a computer display mode in which content is internally represented on a computer screen in terms of characters rather than individual pixels. Typically, the screen consists of a uniform rectangular grid of character cells, each of which contains one of the characters of a character set; at the same time, contrasted to graphics mode or other kinds of computer graphics modes.

A screenshot of MS-DOS 6.22 in the command line which is an example of text mode.

Text mode applications communicate with the user by using command-line interfaces and text user interfaces. Many character sets used in text mode applications also contain a limited set of predefined semi-graphical characters usable for drawing boxes and other rudimentary graphics, which can be used to highlight the content or to simulate widget or control interface objects found in GUI programs. A typical example is the IBM code page 437 character set.

An important characteristic of text mode programs is that they assume monospaced fonts, where every character has the same width on screen, which allows them to easily maintain the vertical alignment when displaying semi-graphical characters. This was an analogy of early mechanical printers which had fixed pitch. This way, the output seen on the screen could be sent directly to the printer maintaining the same format.

Depending on the environment, the screen buffer can be directly addressable. Programs that display output on remote video terminals must issue special control sequences to manipulate the screen buffer. The most popular standards for such control sequences are ANSI and VT100.

Programs accessing the screen buffer through control sequences may lose synchronization with the actual display so that many text mode programs have a redisplay everything command, often associated with the Ctrl+L key combination.

== History ==
Text mode video rendering came to prominence in the early 1970s, when video-oriented text terminals started to replace teleprinters in the interactive use of computers.

== Benefits ==
The advantages of text modes as compared to graphics modes include lower memory consumption and faster screen manipulation. At the time text terminals were beginning to replace teleprinters in the 1970s, the extremely high cost of random-access memory in that period made it exorbitantly expensive to install enough memory for a computer to simultaneously store the current value of every pixel on a screen, to form what would now be called a framebuffer. Early framebuffers were standalone devices which cost tens of thousands of dollars, in addition to the expense of the advanced high-resolution displays to which they were connected. For applications that required simple line graphics but for which the expense of a framebuffer could not be justified, vector displays were a popular workaround. But there were many computer applications (e.g., data entry into a database) for which all that was required was the ability to render ordinary text in a quick and cost-effective fashion to a cathode-ray tube.

Text mode avoids the problem of expensive memory by having dedicated display hardware re-render each line of text from characters into pixels with each scan of the screen by the cathode ray. In turn, the display hardware needs only enough memory to store the pixels equivalent to one line of text (or even less) at a time. Thus, the computer's screen buffer only stores and knows about the underlying text characters (hence the name "text mode") and the only location where the actual pixels representing those characters exist as a single unified image is the screen itself, as viewed by the user (thanks to the phenomenon of persistence of vision).

For example, a screen buffer sufficient to hold a standard grid of 80 by 25 characters requires at least 2,000 bytes. Assuming a monochrome display, 8 bits per byte, and a standard size of 8 times 8 bits for each character, a framebuffer large enough to hold every pixel on the resulting screen would require at least 128,000 bits, 16,000 bytes, or just under 16 kilobytes. By the standards of modern computers, these may seem like trivial amounts of memory, but to put them in context, the original Apple II was released in 1977 with only four kilobytes of memory and a price of $1,300 in U.S. dollars (at a time when the minimum wage in the United States was only $2.30 per hour). Furthermore, from a business perspective, the business case for text terminals made no sense unless they could be produced and operated more cheaply than the paper-hungry teleprinters they were supposed to replace.

Another advantage of text mode is that it has relatively low bandwidth requirements in remote terminal use. Thus, a text mode remote terminal can necessarily update the screen much faster than a graphics mode remote terminal linked to the same amount of bandwidth (and in turn will seem more responsive), since the remote server may only need to transmit a few dozen bytes for each screen update in text mode, as opposed to complex raster graphics remote procedure calls that may require the transmission and rendering of entire bitmaps.

== User-defined characters ==
The border between text mode and graphical programs can sometimes be fuzzy, especially on the PC's VGA hardware, because many later text mode programs tried to push the model to the extreme by playing with the video controller. For example, they redefined the character set in order to create custom semi-graphical characters, or even created the appearance of a graphical mouse pointer by redefining the appearance of the characters over which the mouse pointer was shown at a given time.

Text mode rendering with user-defined characters has also been useful for 2D computer and video games because the game screen can be manipulated much faster than with pixel-oriented rendering.

== Technical basis ==
A video controller implementing a text mode usually uses two distinct areas of memory. Character memory or a pattern table contains a raster font in use, where each character is represented by a dot matrix (a matrix of bits), so the character memory could be considered as a three-dimensional bit array. Display matrix (a text buffer, screen buffer, or nametable) tracks which character is in each cell. In the simple case, the display matrix can be just a matrix of code points (so named character pointer table), but it usually stores for each character position not only a code, but also attributes.

C L	0; 0; 0; 0; 0	0; 0; 0; 0; 1	0; 0; 0; 1; 0	0; 0; 0; 1; 1	0; 0; 1; 0; 0	0; 0; 1; 0; 1	0; 0; 1; 1; 0	0; 0; 1; 1; 1	00000000; 11111111; 00001111; 00110011; 01010101	11… 00… 00… 00… 01…
00000		■	■	■	■	■				
00001	■	■				■	■			
00010	■	■		■	■	■	■			
00011	■	■		■	■	■	■			
00100	■	■		■	■	■	■			
00101	■	■								
00110		■	■	■	■					
00111										
01000; 01001 …	… … …									
A sample of character box and corresponding electronic scheme. The glyph is 8×8 pixels, with 3-bit low parts of scan line and dot counter. The screen is between 20×18 and 32×32 character cells, with 5-bit indices.

In the case of raster scan output, which is the most common for computer monitors, the corresponding video signal is made by the character generator, a special electronic unit similar to devices with the same name used in video technology. The video controller has two registers: scan line counter and dot counter, serving as coordinates in the screen dot matrix. Each of them must be divided by corresponding glyph size to obtain an index in the display matrix; the remainder is an index in glyph matrix. If glyph size equals to 2^{n}, then it is possible just to use n low bits of a binary register as an index in glyph matrix, and the rest of bits as an index in the display matrix — see the scheme.

The character memory resides in read-only memory in some systems. Other systems allow the use of RAM for this purpose, making it possible to redefine the typeface and even the character set for application-specific purposes. The use of RAM-based characters also facilitates some special techniques, such as the implementation of a pixel-graphics frame buffer by reserving some characters for a bitmap and writing pixels directly to their corresponding character memory. In some historical graphics chips, including the TMS9918, the MOS Technology VIC, and the Game Boy graphics hardware, this was actually the canonical way of doing pixel graphics.

Text modes often assign attributes to the displayed characters. For example, the VT100 terminal allows each character to be underlined, brightened, blinking or inverse. Color-supporting devices usually allow the color of each character, and often the background color as well, to be selected from a limited palette of colors. These attributes can either coexist with the character indices or use a different memory area called color memory or attribute memory.

Some text mode implementations also have the concept of line attributes. For example, the VT100-compatible line of text terminals supports the doubling of the width and height of the characters on individual text lines.

== PC common text modes ==
Depending on the graphics adapter used, a variety of text modes are available on IBM PC–compatible computers. They are listed on the table below:

Text resolution	Character size	Graphics resolution	Colors	Adapters
80×25	9×14	720×350	B&W text	MDA, Hercules
40×25	8×8	320×200	16 colors	CGA, EGA
80×25	8×8	640×200	16 colors	CGA, EGA
80×25	8×14	640×350	16 colors	EGA
80×43	8×8	640×350	16 colors	EGA
80×25	9×16	720×400	16 colors	VGA
80×30	8×16	640×480	16 colors	VGA
80×50	9×8	720×400	16 colors	VGA
80×60			16 colors	VESA-compatible Super VGA
132×25			16 colors	VESA-compatible Super VGA
132×43			16 colors	VESA-compatible Super VGA
132×50			16 colors	VESA-compatible Super VGA
132×60			16 colors	VESA-compatible Super VGA

MDA text could be emphasized with bright, underline, reverse and blinking attributes.

Video cards in general are backward compatible, i.e. EGA supports all MDA and CGA modes, VGA supports MDA, CGA and EGA modes.

By far the most common text mode used in DOS environments, and initial Windows consoles, is the default 80 columns by 25 rows, or 80×25, with 16 colors. This mode was available on practically all IBM and compatible personal computers. Several programs, such as terminal emulators, used only 80×24 for the main display and reserved the bottom row for a status bar.

Two other VGA text modes, 80×43 and 80×50, exist but were very rarely used. The 40-column text modes were never very popular outside games and other applications designed for compatibility with television monitors, and were used only for demonstration purposes or with very old hardware.

Character sizes and graphical resolutions for the extended VESA-compatible Super VGA text modes are manufacturer-dependent. Also on these display adapters, available colors can be halved from 16 to 8 when a second customized character set is employed (giving a total repertoire of 512 —instead the common 256— different graphic characters simultaneously displayed on the screen).

Some cards (e.g. S3) supported custom very large text modes, like 100×37 or even 160×120. In Linux systems, a program called SVGATextMode is often used with SVGA cards to set up very large console text modes, such as for use with split-screen terminal multiplexers.

== Modern usage ==
Many modern programs with a graphical interface simulate the display style of text mode programs, notably when it is important to preserve the vertical alignment of text, e.g., during computer programming. There exist also software components to emulate text mode, such as terminal emulators or command line consoles. In Microsoft Windows, the Win32 console usually opens in emulated, graphical window mode. It can be switched to full screen, true text mode and vice versa by pressing the Alt and Enter keys together. This is no longer supported by the WDDM display drivers introduced with Windows Vista.

Linux virtual consoles operate in text mode. Most Linux distributions support several virtual console screens, accessed by pressing Ctrl, Alt and a function key together.

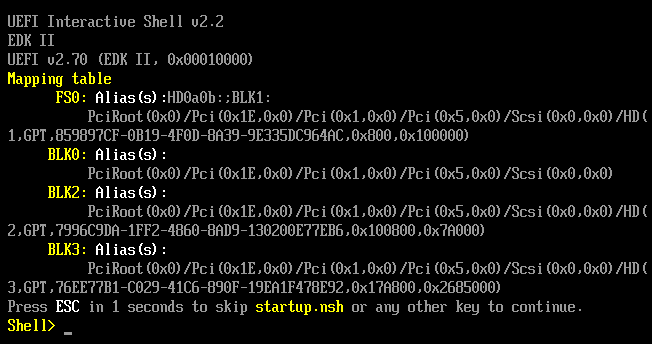
UEFI shell implemented with Simple Text Output Protocol

The AAlib open source library is designed to convert standard image and video formats, such as PNG and WMV, into ASCII characters. This enables a rudimentary viewing of graphics files on text mode systems, and on text mode web browsers such as Lynx.

UEFI-based systems provide Unicode text mode output support with Simple Text Output Protocol. Minimum supported text resolution is at least 80×25 and minimal recommended character set includes Basic Latin Unicode characters.

== See also ==
- Text-based user interface
- Teletext
- Text semigraphics
- ASCII art
- Twin
- Hardware code page
- VGA text mode
- Line-oriented printer
- Characters per line
