= Console (computer games) =

Command line interface in computer games

A console is a command line interface where the personal computer game's settings and variables can be edited while the game is running. Consoles also usually display a log of warnings, errors, and other messages produced during the program's execution. Typically it can be toggled on or off and appears over the normal game view.

The console is often accessed by pressing the backtick key ` (frequently also called the ~ key; normally located below the ESC key) on QWERTY keyboards or the ² on AZERTY keyboards, and is usually hidden by default. In most cases it cannot be accessed unless enabled by either specifying a command-line argument when launching the game or by changing one of the game's configuration files.

Some games integrate the console with the in-game chat, and in this case usually allow running commands by prefixing them with a forward slash /.

== History ==
A classic console is a box that scrolls down from the top of the screen. This style was made popular with Quake (1996). There are other forms of console:

- Quake III Arena has one or two consoles, depending on the platform the game was released for. The first is the internal console, which exists on all platforms. The second is an external console, created via the Windows API. The console printing function directs to both, likewise, both consoles can also have text input to them. The external console is used for dedicated servers and to log startup of the engine. Finally, the external console is also used to show errors and display debugging output should the game crash.
- Dark Engine's console shows output up to 4 lines in length and is accessed by pressing 3 particular keys at the same time.
- Lithtech's console has no output and is used mainly for entering cheat codes.
- ARK: Survival Evolved is an open world action and adventure survival video game is by Studio Wildcard. A lot of ARK commands will require the ‘Enable Cheats‘ command to be used before going further, as well as the Enable Cheats for Player command. It is an absolute must to use this before using to any other command.
- A single-line variant can be seen in games from The Sims series, to which can be invoked using Ctrl+Shift+C. While mainly used for cheats, it can also be used for purposes similar to most developer console implementations.
- On the Microsoft Windows version of Grand Theft Auto V, the console appears as a floating text box in the middle of the screen, and is generally used to enter cheat codes or spawn items.
- The Source engine's console is a window all by itself.

== Example commands ==
- sv_cheats 1: Used to activate cheats in Quake engine or Source engine based games.
- god: Used to toggle God mode.
  - buddha: Similar to god mode in Source games, where the player can take damage down to a health of 1 but not die.
- noclip or ghost: Used to toggle Noclip mode.
- fly: Similar to Noclip mode, the player is only constrained to the walls and boundaries of the map.
- impulse 101: Gives the player full health, full ammo, and all weapons in Source Engine based games. Similar to "giveall".
- giveall or give all Gives every item in the game.
- addbots (number): When AI bots are available, this will add a number of bots equal to the number inputted by the player.
- allammo: Gives the player maximum ammo.
- kill or suicide: Causes the player to die, used when a player gets stuck during a game.
  - explode: In Source games, this will cause the player to explode.
    - Left 4 Dead being a notable exception, where the explode command was used to trigger the Boomer's on-death attack prematurely.
- give or summon: When used with the name of an entity, spawns that entity at the players location.
- quit: Quits the game immediately
