= NComm =

NComm is one of the most popular shareware terminal programs used on the Commodore Amiga line of computers, especially for connecting to BBS systems via a modem connected to the telephone line. The program was originally written by Daniel Bloch and further development handed over to Torkel Lodberg. The last version v3.06 was released in 1996, a public key was released in 1998 to allow full usage.

On june 23 2026, more than 30 years after the last release in 1996, a new bugfixed version, v3.07 was released.

The program was reviewed by André Viergever at Amiga Magazine in 1992.

== See also ==
- Zmodem - File transfer protocol
- CU Amiga Magazine
