= Tmux =

Terminal multiplexer

tmux

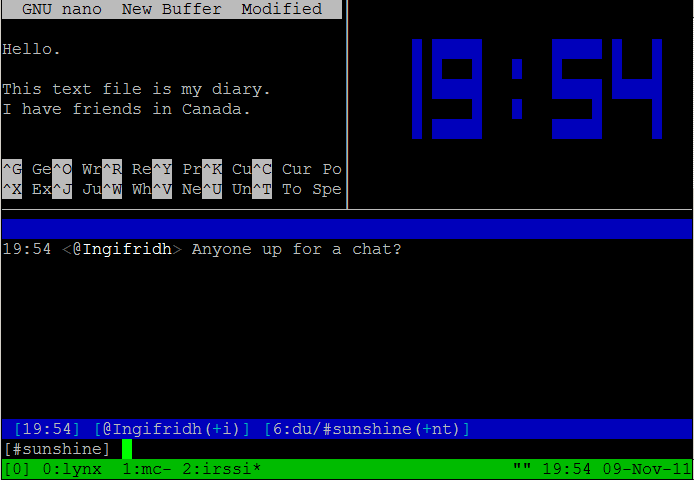
- tmux session, with two horizontal and one vertical pane.
- Developer: Nicholas Marriott
- Initial release: 20 November 2007; 18 years ago
- Stable release: 3.6a / 5 December 2025; 3 months ago
- Written in: C
- Operating system: Unix-like
- Available in: English
- Type: Terminal multiplexer
- License: ISC license
- Website: tmux.github.io
- Repository: cvsweb.openbsd.org/src/usr.bin/tmux

tmux is an open-source terminal multiplexer for Unix-like operating systems. It allows multiple terminal sessions to be accessed simultaneously in a single window. It is useful for running more than one command-line program at the same time. It can also be used to detach processes from their controlling terminals, allowing remote sessions to remain active without being visible.

== Features ==
tmux includes most features of GNU Screen. It allows users to start a terminal session with clients that are not bound to a specific physical or virtual console; multiple terminal sessions can be created within a single terminal session and then freely rebound from one virtual console to another, and each session can have several connected clients.

Some notable tmux features are:

- Menus for interactive selection of running sessions, windows or clients
- Window can be linked to an arbitrary number of sessions
- vi-like or Emacs command mode (with auto completion) for managing tmux
- Vertical and horizontal window split support

tmux lacks built-in serial port and telnet support. It uses different command keys from the ones used by screen, so it is not a drop-in replacement for screen, but it can be configured to use compatible keybindings.

== Availability ==
tmux is included in the OpenBSD base system, and is available as a package for many other Unix-like operating systems.

== See also ==
- Byobu (software)
- Mosh (software)
- Twin (windowing system)
- xpra
