= VT220 =

Computer terminal from Digital Equipment Corporation

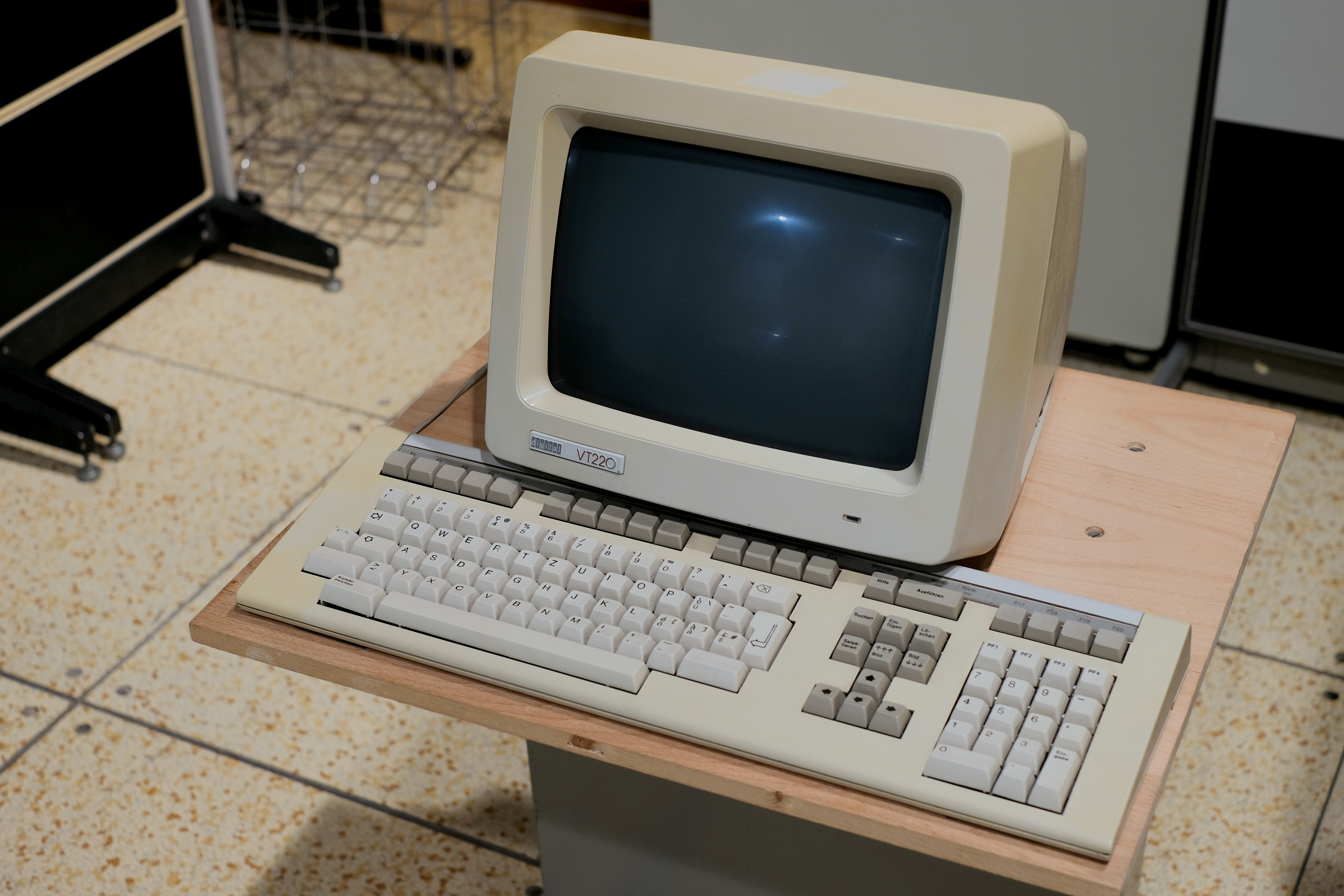
- DEC VT220 terminal with LK201 keyboard
- Manufacturer: DEC
- Type: Computer terminal
- Released: November 1983
- Introductory price: US$1,295 (equivalent to $4,200 in 2025)
- CPU: Intel 8051 @ 11.0592 MHz
- Memory: 16 KB RAM; 24 KB ROM; 256 byte NVRAM
- Display: 12 in (30 cm) CRT; 80x24 characters
- Input: LK201 keyboard
- Connectivity: RS-232 serial 20 mA current loop DE-9 serial printer port
- Predecessor: VT100
- Successor: VT320

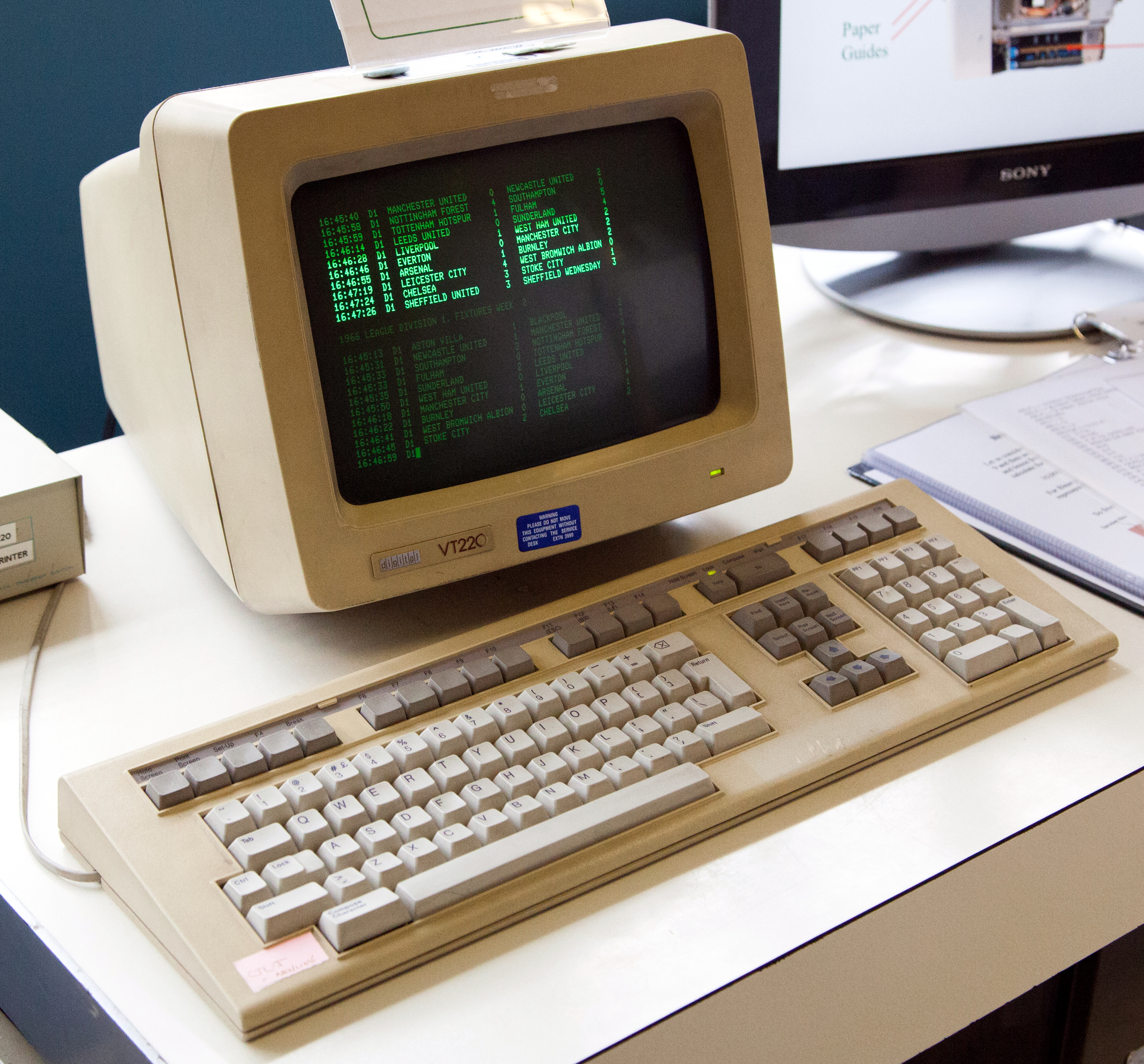
DEC VT220 in use at The National Museum of Computing

The VT200 series is a family of computer terminals introduced by Digital Equipment Corporation (DEC) in November 1983. The VT220 was the basic version, a text-only version with multi-lingual capabilities. The VT240 added monochrome ReGIS vector graphics support to the base model, while the VT241 did the same in color. The 200 series replaced the successful VT100 series, providing more functionality in a much smaller unit with a much smaller and lighter keyboard. Like the VT100, the VT200 series implemented a large subset of ANSI X3.64. Among its major upgrades was a number of international character sets, as well as the ability to define new character sets.

The VT200 series was extremely successful in the market. Released at $1,295, but later priced at $795, the VT220 offered features, packaging and price that no other serial terminal could compete with at the time. In 1986, DEC shipped 165,000 units, giving them a 42% market share, double that of the closest competitor, Wyse. Competitors adapted by introducing similar models at lower prices, leading DEC to do the same by releasing the less-expensive $545 VT300 series in 1987. By that time, DEC had shipped over one million VT220s.

== Hardware ==
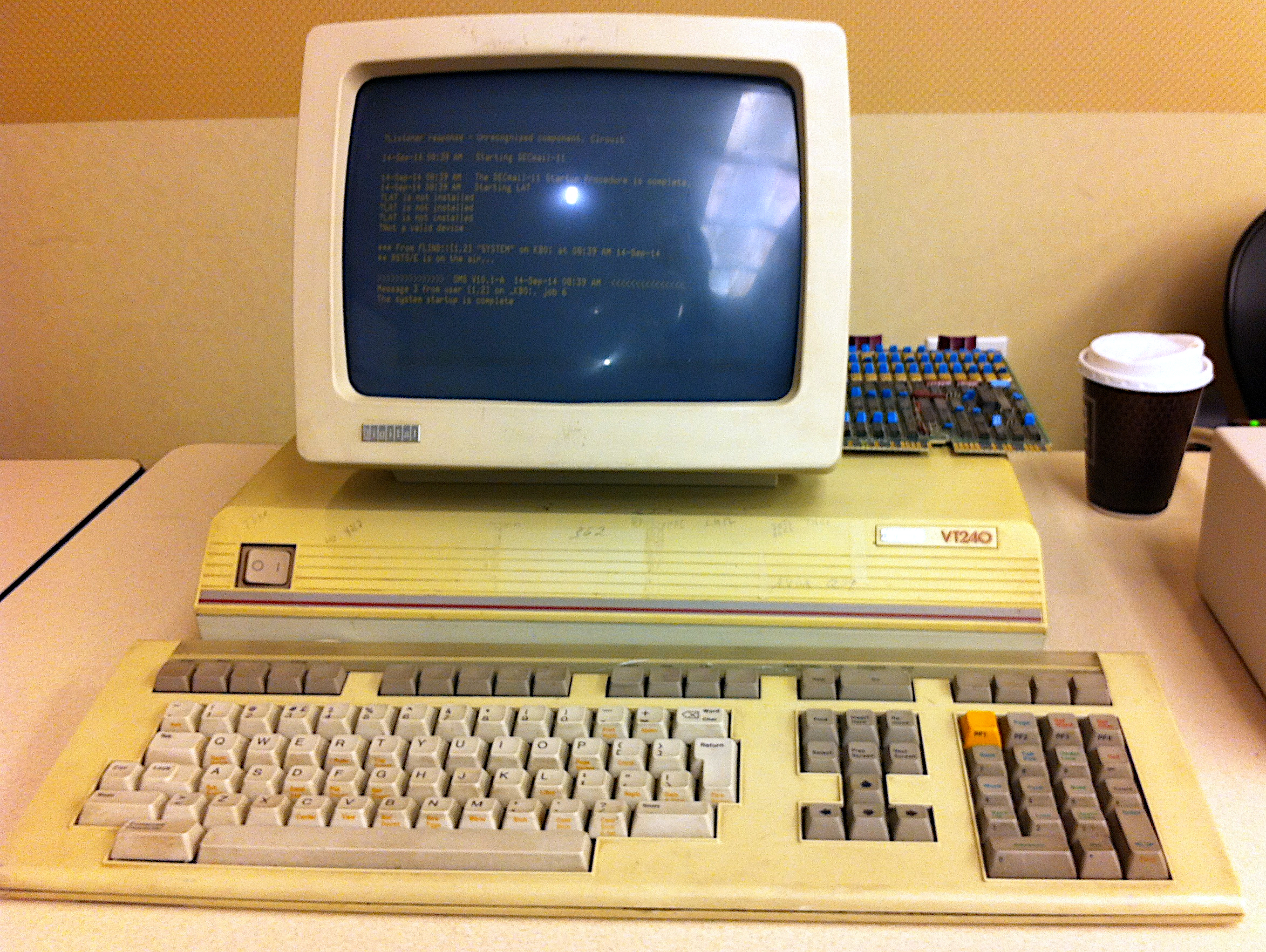
DEC VT240

The VT220 improved on the earlier VT100 series of terminals with a redesigned keyboard, much smaller physical packaging, and a faster microprocessor, the Intel 8051 microcontroller. The VT220 was available with CRTs that used white, green, or amber phosphors.

The VT100s, like the VT50s before them, had been packaged in relatively large cases that provided room for expansion systems. The VT200s abandoned this concept, and wrapped the much smaller 1980s-era electronics tightly around the CRT. The result was a truncated pyramidal case with the apex at the back, only slightly larger than the CRT. This made it much easier to fit the terminal on a desk.

Normally the monitor sat facing upward at about a 15 degree angle. Because it was lower than head height, the result was an especially ergonomic terminal. On the rear bottom of the case was a carrying handle that could also be used to angle the monitor more forward. An extendable post could do so to even greater angles, allowing the monitor to face directly forward.

The LK201 keyboard supplied with the VT220 was one of the first full-length, low-profile keyboards available; it was developed at DEC's Roxbury, Massachusetts facility. It was much smaller and lighter than the VT100s version, and connected to the terminal using a lighter and more flexible coiled cable and a telephone jack connector.

The VT200s were the last DEC terminals to provide a 20mA current loop serial interface (using a 8-pin Molex-style connector), an older standard originally developed for the telegraph system but later popular on computers due to the early use of Teletype Model 33s as ad hoc terminals. A standard 25-pin D-connector was also provided for RS-232. Only one of the two ports could be in use at a given time. Later DEC terminals would replace both of these with their proprietary Modified Modular Jack (MMJ) connectors.

Another version of the terminal, the VT240, used DEC's own DEC T-11, a single-chip microcontroller version of the PDP-11 minicomputer. This was housed in a separate case that sat on the desk with the monitor on top. The VT241 is the color version of the VT240, consisting of the same V240 base unit with VR-241 color monitor. A VT240 can be upgraded to a VT241 by replacing the monitor and the cable.

== Software ==
The VT220 was designed to be compatible with the VT100, but added features to make it more suitable for an international market. This was accomplished by including a number of different character sets that could be selected using a series of ANSI commands.

Glyphs were formed within a 10 by 10 grid. The terminal shipped with a total of 288 characters in its ROM, each one formed from an 8 by 10-pixel glyph. Using only 8 of the columns left space between the characters. The characters included the 96 printable ASCII characters, 67 Display Controls, 32 DEC Special Graphics, and a backward question mark used to represent undefined characters.

The VT200s included the ability to make minor changes to the character set using the National Replacement Character Set (NRCS) concept. When operating on an 8-bit clean link up to 256 character codes were available, which included a full set of European characters. However, when operating on a typical 7-bit link, only 128 were available, and only 96 of these produced display output, while the rest were control characters. This was not enough characters to handle all European languages. Most terminals solved this by shipping multiple complete character sets in ROM and switching from one to another, but there was a cost in doing so.

DEC's solution to this problem, NRCS, allowed individual characters glyphs in the base set of 96 7-bit characters to be swapped out. For instance, the British set made a single substitution, replacing the US's hash character, #, with the pound sign, £. The terminal included 14 such replacement sets, most of which swapped out about a dozen characters. This eliminated the need to ship 14 versions of the terminal or to include 14 different 7-bit character sets in a large ROM. Instead, only a single slightly larger set was implemented, and individually swapped into the lower portion of the main set as needed.

Additionally, the VT200s allowed for another 96 characters in the Dynamically Redefined Character Set (DRCS), which could be downloaded from the host computer. Data for the glyphs was sent by encoding a set of six vertical pixels into a single character code, and then sending many of these sixels to the terminal, which decoded them into the character set memory. In later models, the same sixel concept would be used to send bitmapped graphics as well. Character graphics were a common example of these downloaded sets.

== Escape key controversy ==
Prior to the VT220, if an Escape key was present, it was positioned in the upper left corner of the keyboard. The VT220 moved it to the typical location for the f11 key, in the middle of the top row of keys. For users of the TECO editor, in which it is heavily used, this was inconvenient.

== Legacy ==
In 1983-1984, during the design phase of the IBM Model M keyboard, the VT220 was a new and very popular product. IBM's design team chose to emulate its LK201 keyboard layout. Key innovations that IBM copied were the inverted-T shape of the arrow cluster, the navigation keys above it, and the numeric keypad off to its right. Eventually the popularity of the IBM PC would lead to the Model M layout becoming standardized by ANSI and ISO. Through those standards, minor variations of the VT220's keyboard layout have dominated keyboard design ever since.

== See also ==
- ANSI escape code
- Rainbow 100
- Vttest - VT100 / VT220 / xterm test utility
