= Modified Modular Jack =

Serial port connector type

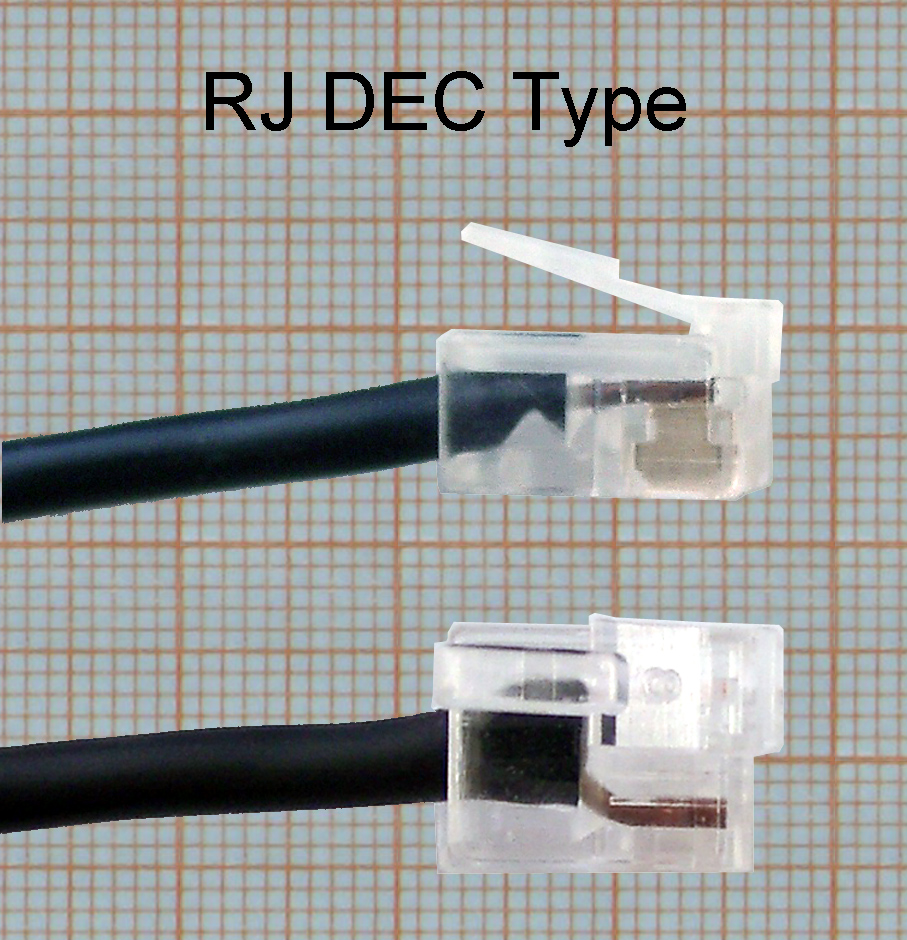
- MMJ socket and plug
- Type: RS-423 serial

Production history
- Designer: Digital Equipment Corporation

Pinout
Pin 1	Data terminal ready	DTR
Pin 2	Transmit data	Tx+
Pin 3	Transmit data ground	Tx-
Pin 4	Receive data ground	Rx-
Pin 5	Receive data	Rx+
Pin 6	Data set ready	DSR

The Modified Modular Jack (MMJ) is a small form-factor serial port connector developed by Digital Equipment Corporation (DEC). It uses a modified version of the 6P6C modular connector with the latch displaced off-center so that standard modular connectors for telephone jacks cannot accidentally be plugged in. MMJ connections are used on Digital minicomputers, such as the PDP-11, VAX and Alpha systems, and to connect terminals, printers, and serial console servers.

The MMJ connector has six conductors. As defined by DEC, the six pins are Tx and Rx for the data transmission, their return paths, and DSR and DTR for handshaking. The transmit and receive signals are differential: each signal is the voltage difference between the line and its associated ground, as opposed to a voltage on a single connector relative to a common reference. The electrical signaling is defined by the EIA RS-422 standard. The system can interoperate with RS-232 signaling by shorting the lower voltage sides of each signal to the RS-232 signal ground line. In this case, RS-232 limits apply to data rate and cable length.

When connecting two DTE devices such as a computer and a printer, the Digital BC16E crossover cable is used.

The DEC VT320 and TI/HP-928 were terminals offering an MMJ option. Using RS-422 signaling over 6-conductor RJ12, cables could be up to 1000 meters.

Thrustmaster is using the MMJ connector for connecting its line of rudder pedals and racing pedals to either USB via a proprietary Thrustmaster Adapter, or directly to a joystick or racing wheel.

The Lego Mindstorms NXT and EV3 set used connectors similar to MMJ for motors and sensors. This was to prevent the connection of standard telephone cords. The MMJ connector used by LEGO is also taller than those used with data terminals.

CEA-909 uses the MMJ connector for control signals to a smart antenna, which can either physically or electrically rotate for maximum signal strength.

== See also ==
- Serial console
