= History of display technology =

Electrically operated display devices have developed from electromechanical systems for display of text, up to all-electronic devices capable of full-motion 3D color graphic displays. Electromagnetic devices, using a solenoid coil to control a visible flag or flap, were the earliest type, and were used for text displays such as stock market prices and arrival/departure display times. The cathode ray tube was the workhorse of text and video display technology for several decades until being displaced by plasma, liquid crystal (LCD), and solid-state devices such as thin-film transistors (TFTs), LEDs and OLEDs. With the advent of metal–oxide–semiconductor field-effect transistors (MOSFETs), integrated circuit (IC) chips, microprocessors, and microelectronic devices, many more individual picture elements ("pixels") could be incorporated into one display device, allowing graphic displays and video.

== Cathode ray tube ==
One of the earliest electronic displays is the cathode-ray tube (CRT), which was first demonstrated in 1897 and made commercial in 1922. The CRT consists of an electron gun that forms images by firing electrons onto a phosphor-coated screen. The earliest CRTs were monochrome and were used primarily in oscilloscopes and black and white televisions. The first commercial colour CRT was produced in 1954. CRTs were the single most popular display technology used in television sets and computer monitors for over half a century; it was not until the 2000s that LCDs began to gradually replace them.

A derivative of CRTs were storage tubes, which had the ability to retain information displayed on them, unlike standard CRTs which need to be refreshed periodically. In 1968, Tektronix introduced the Direct-view bistable storage tube, which went on to be widely used in oscilloscopes and computer terminals.

=== Monochrome CRT ===
1922 Monochrome cathode ray tube:

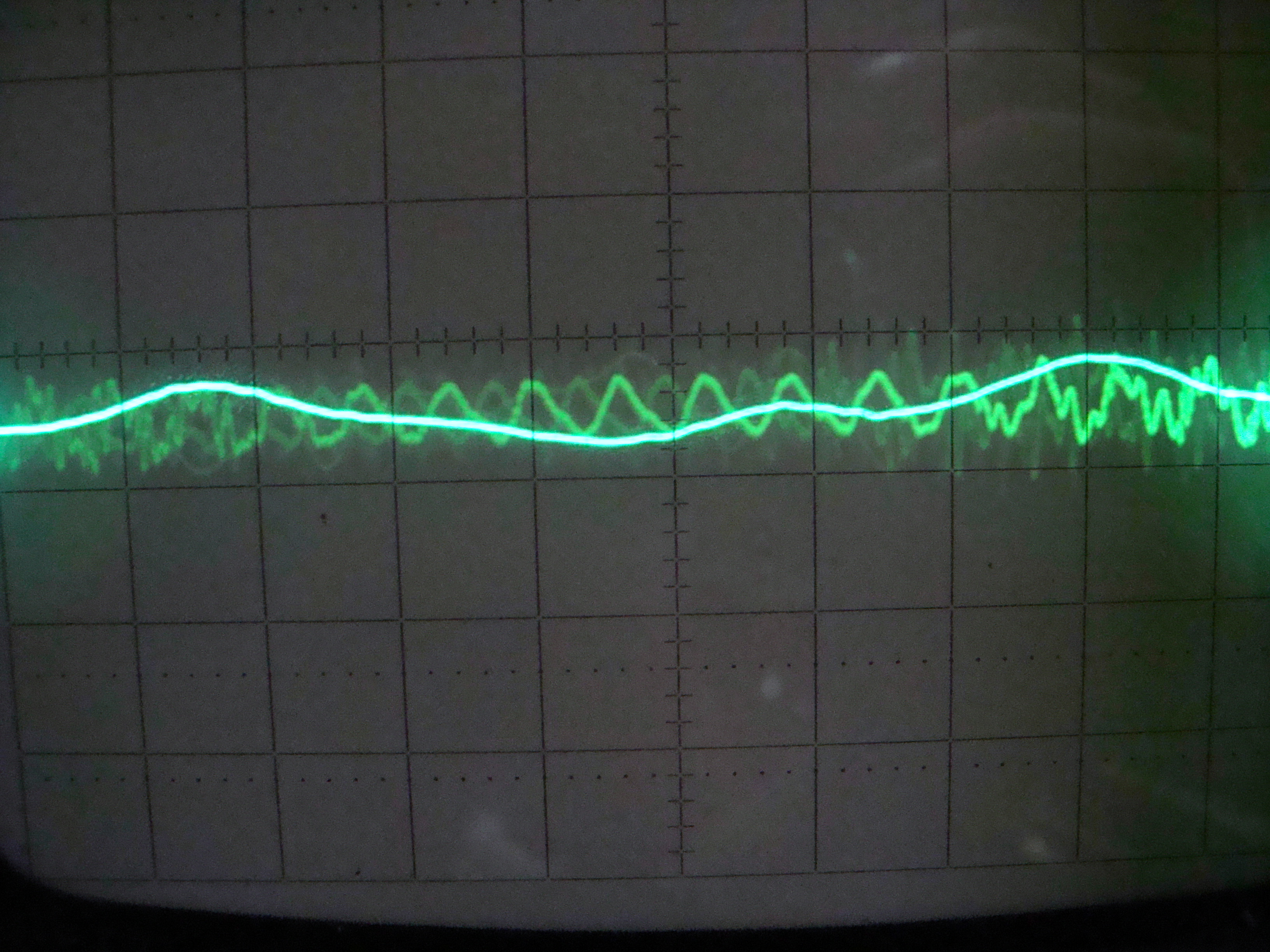
Dual trace, showing different time bases on each trace.

=== Color CRT ===
1954 Color cathode ray tube for the display of color television:

=== Direct-View Bistable Storage Tube ===
1968 The Direct-View Bistable Storage Tube CRT retains static information displayed upon it, written using a steerable electron beam that can be turned off. The DVBST was used in vector displays of early computers and in oscilloscopes.

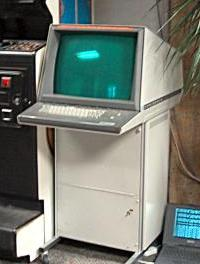
Tektronix 4014 with a "DVBST" storage display screen

== Nixie tube display ==
1955 Nixie tube:

The ten digits of a GN-4 Nixie tube

== Flip-flap or disc display ==
1957 Split-flap display:

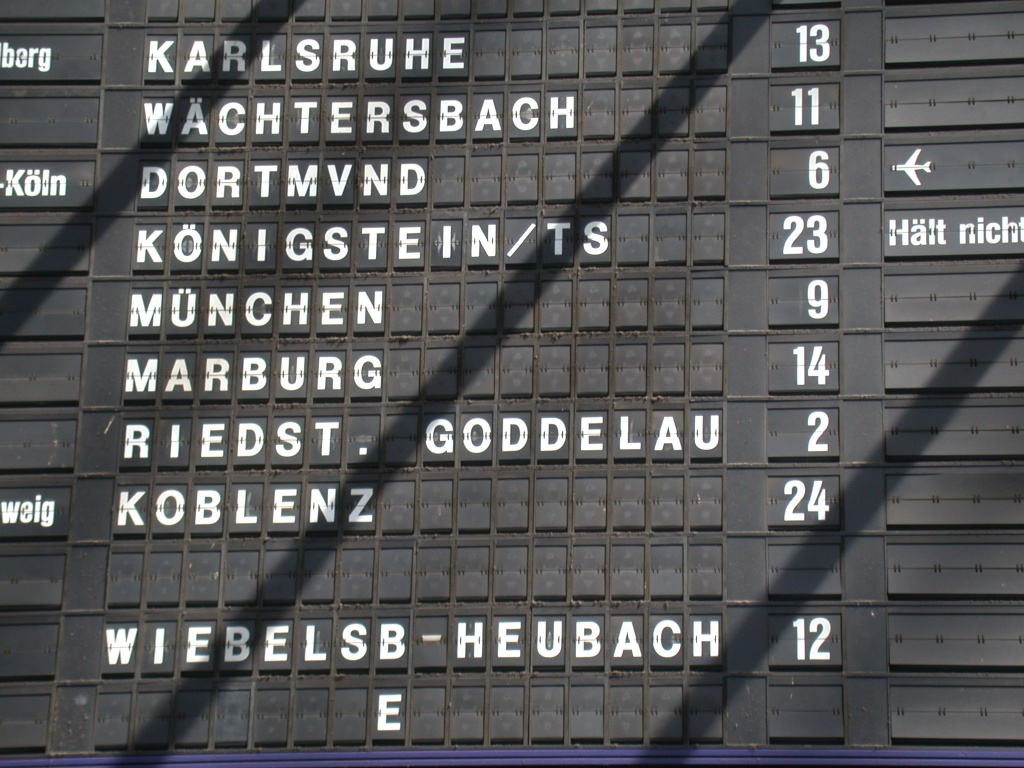

1961 Flip-disc display:

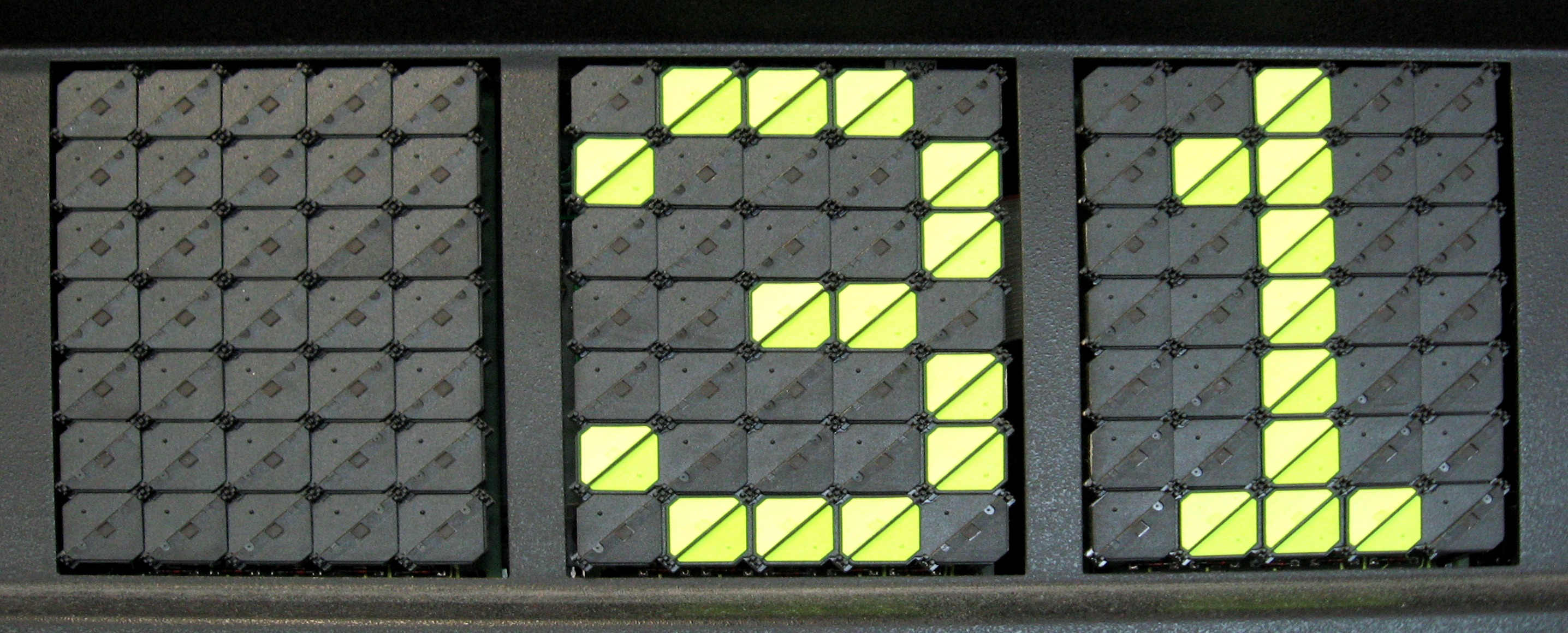
Flip-Dot-Display

== Stroboscopic display ==
1960s Stroboscopic display: In the 1960s RASA Calculator (Russian), a small motor spins a cylinder that has a number of transparent numerals. To display a numeral, the calculator briefly flashes a thyratron light behind the required number when it spins into position.

== Monochrome plasma display ==
1964 Monochrome plasma display:

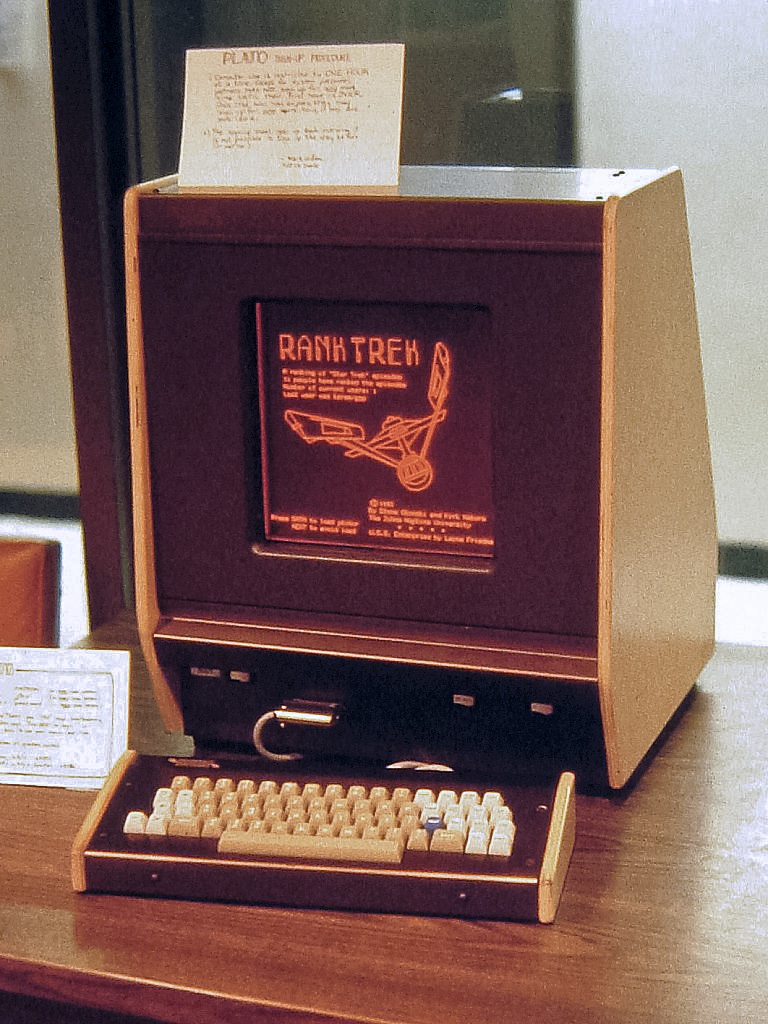
Plasma displays were first used in PLATO computer terminals. This PLATO V model illustrates the display's monochromatic orange glow as seen in 1988.

== LED display ==
1968 LED display:

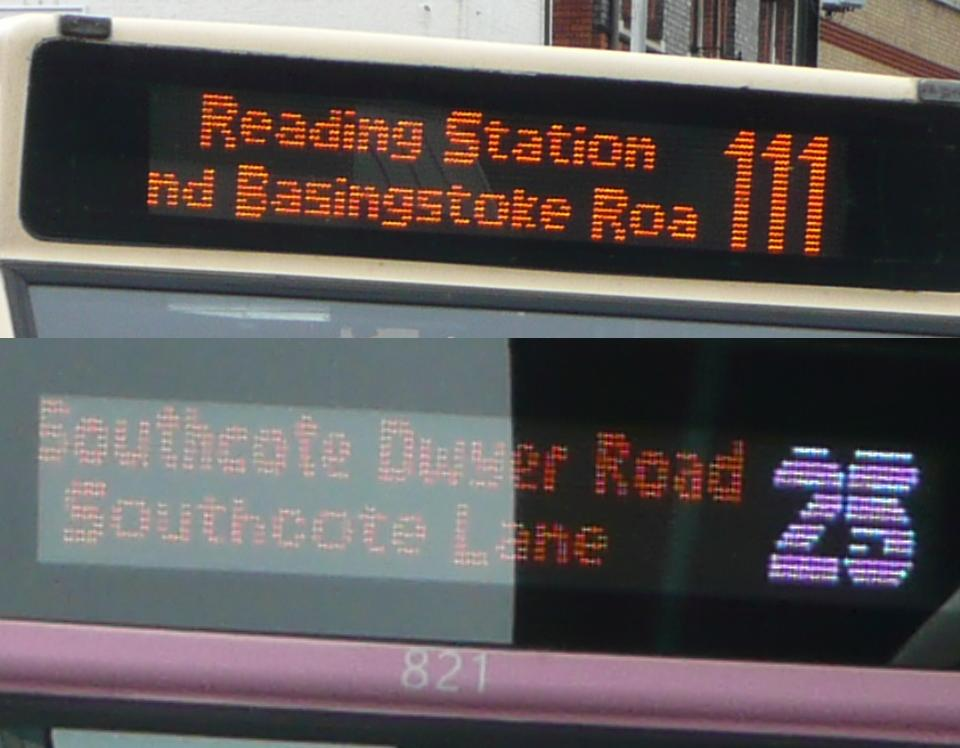
LED destination displays on buses, one with a colored route number.

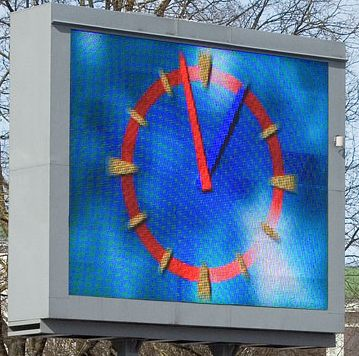
Outdoor 4 x 3 m large LED screen in Jelgava, Latvia.

== Eggcrate display ==
1968 Eggcrate display

== Vacuum fluorescent display ==
1967 Vacuum fluorescent display as used in consumer electronics.

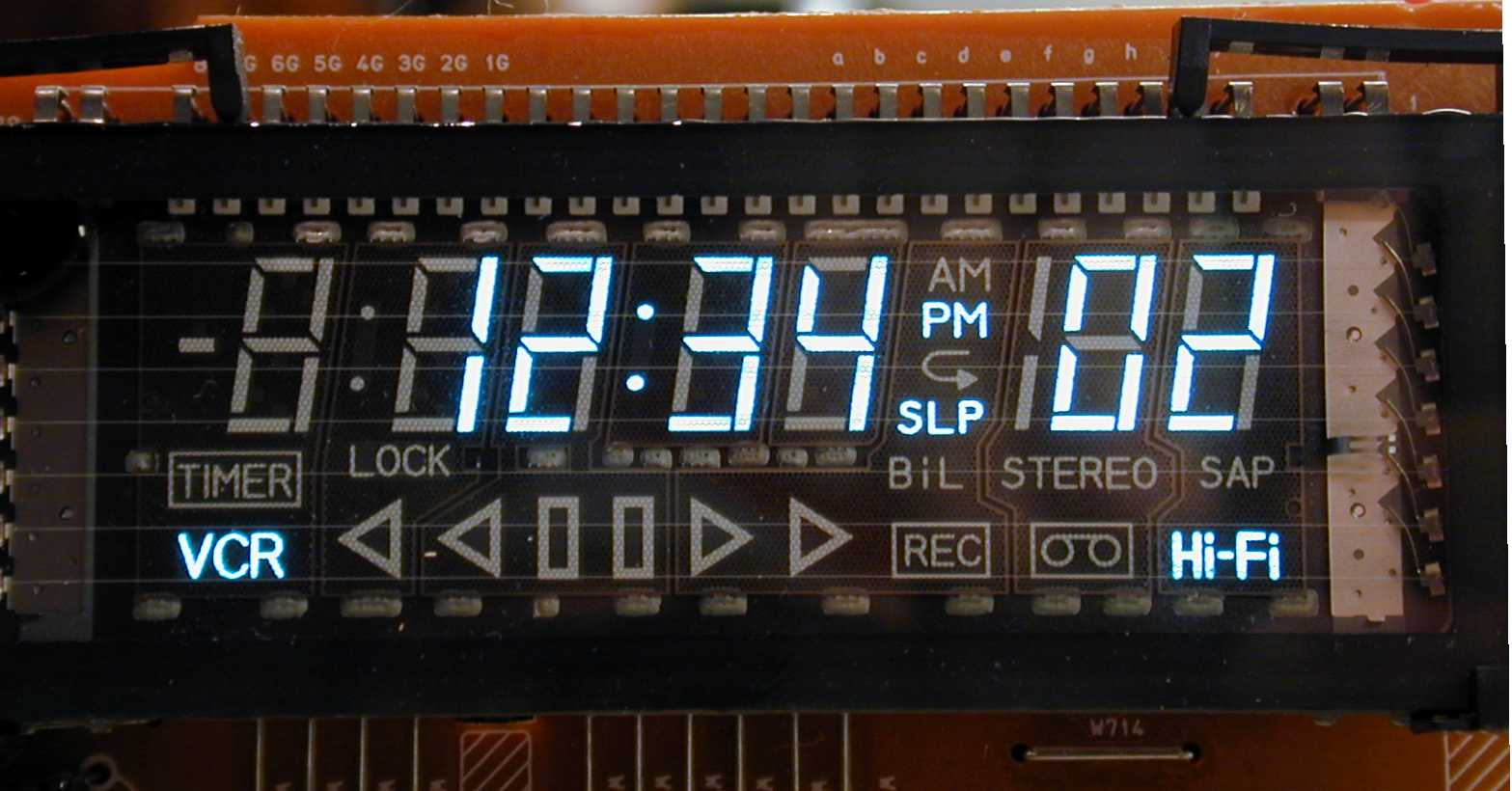
Vacuum fluorescent display used in a videocassette recorder.

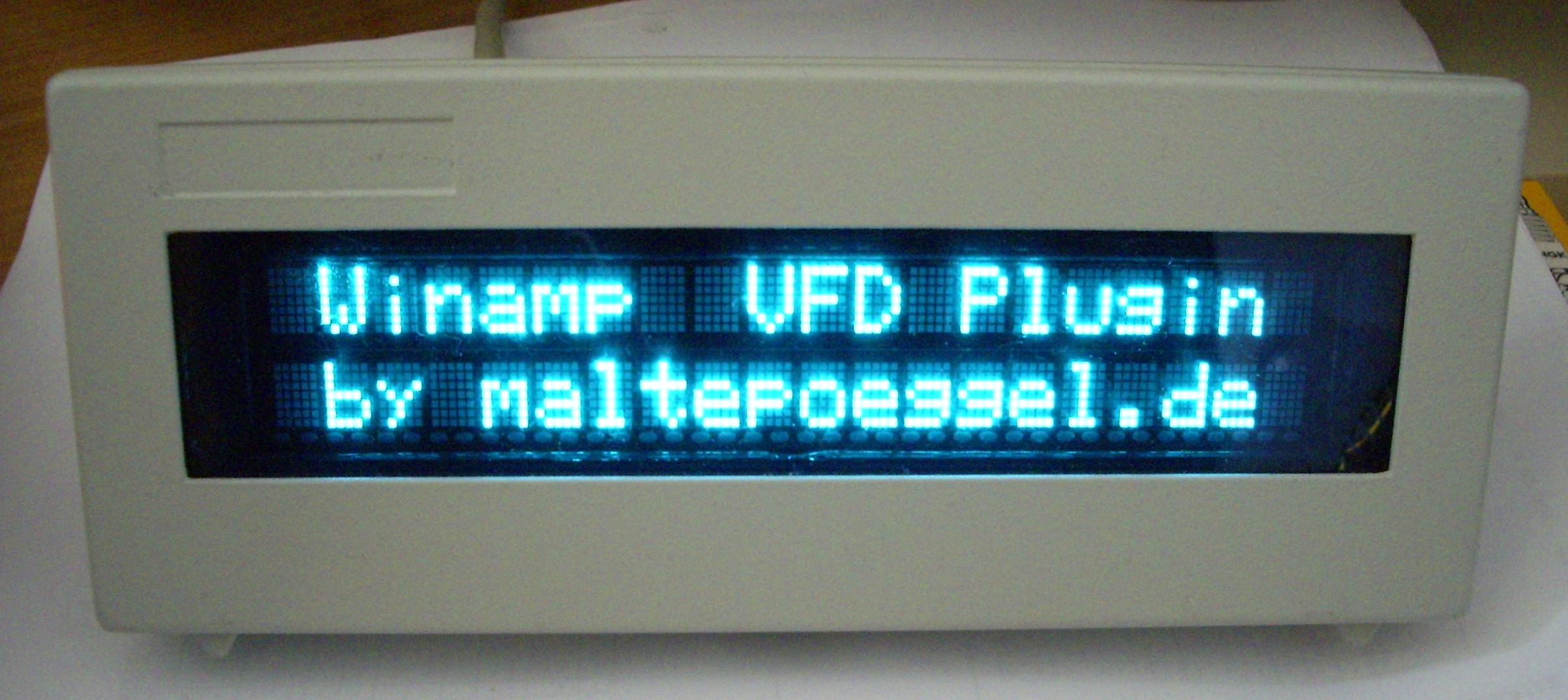
VFD raster display

== Twisted nematic field effect LCD ==
1970 Twisted nematic field effect LCD

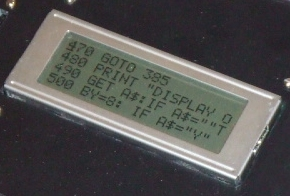

== Electroluminescent display ==
1974 Electroluminescent display (ELD):

== Super-twisted nematic LCD ==
1984 Super-twisted nematic display (STN LCD) to improve passive-matrix LCDs, allowing for the first time higher resolution panels with 540x270 pixels.

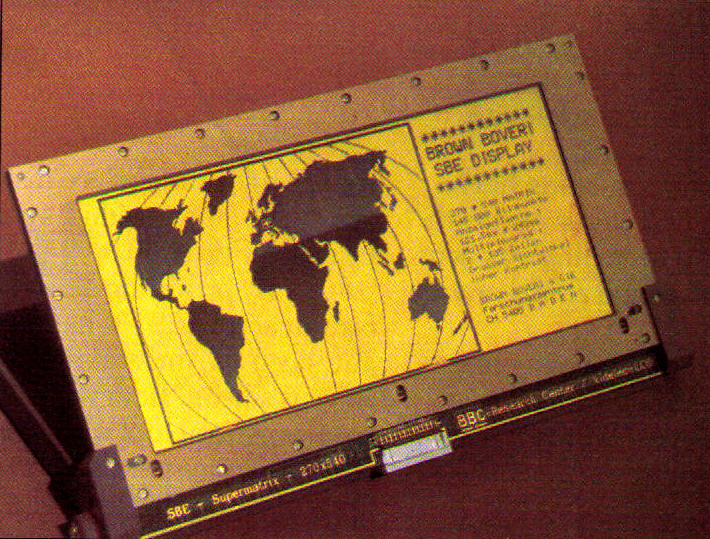
Prototype Brown Boveri STN LCD with 540x270 pixels

== Pin screen ==
Pin screen:

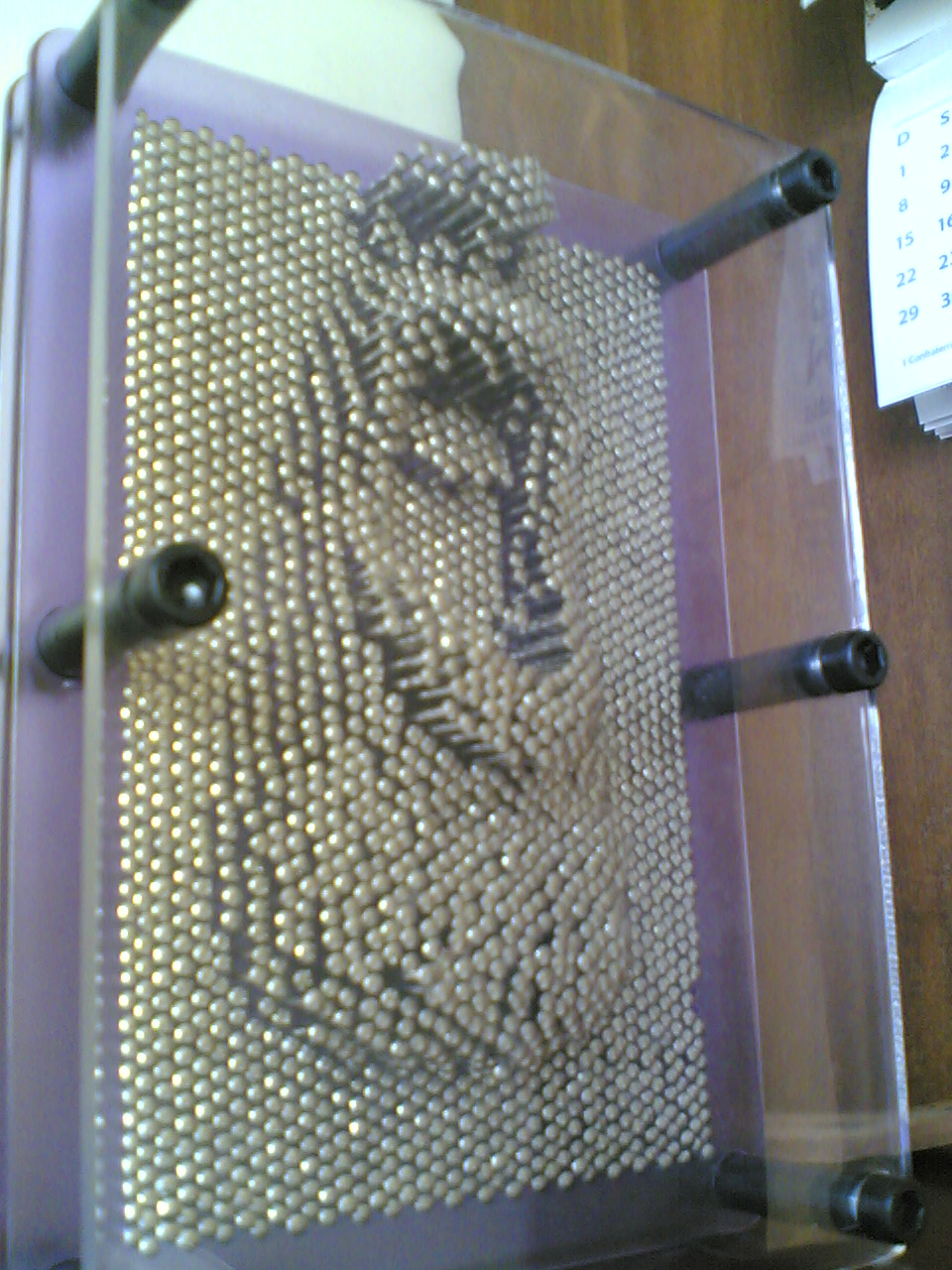

1969 Braille display:

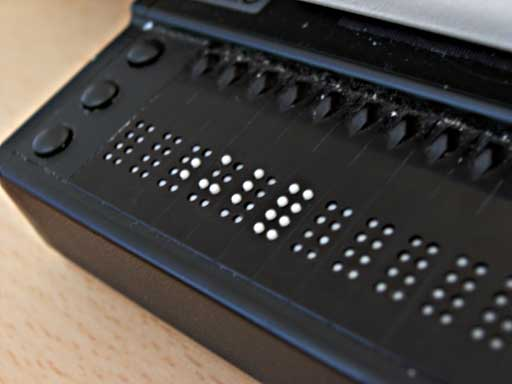

== Thin film transistor LCD ==
1986 Color Thin-film-transistor liquid-crystal display:

== Digital Light Processing ==
1987 optical micro-electro-mechanical technology that uses a digital micromirror device. While the Digital Light Processing (DLP) imaging device was invented by Texas Instruments, the first DLP-based projector was introduced by Digital Projection Ltd in 1997.

== Full-color plasma display ==
1995 Full-color plasma display:

== Organic light-emitting diode ==
2003 Organic light-emitting diode display (OLED)

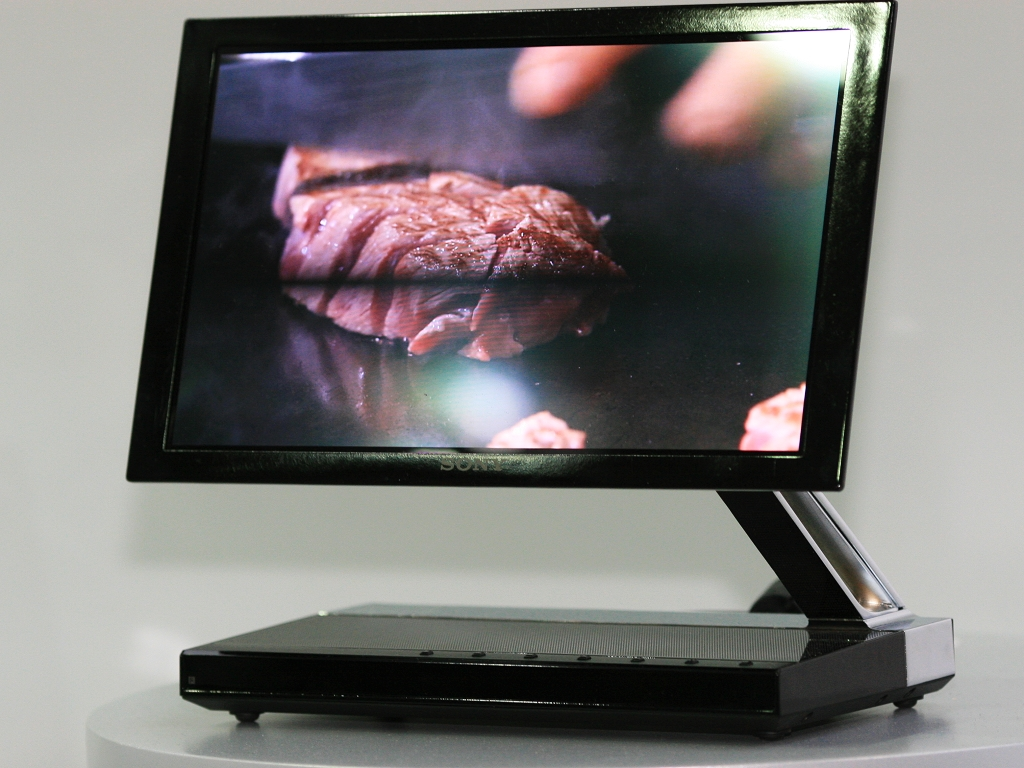
Sony XEL-1, the world's first OLED TV

2003 Active-matrix OLED (AMOLED):

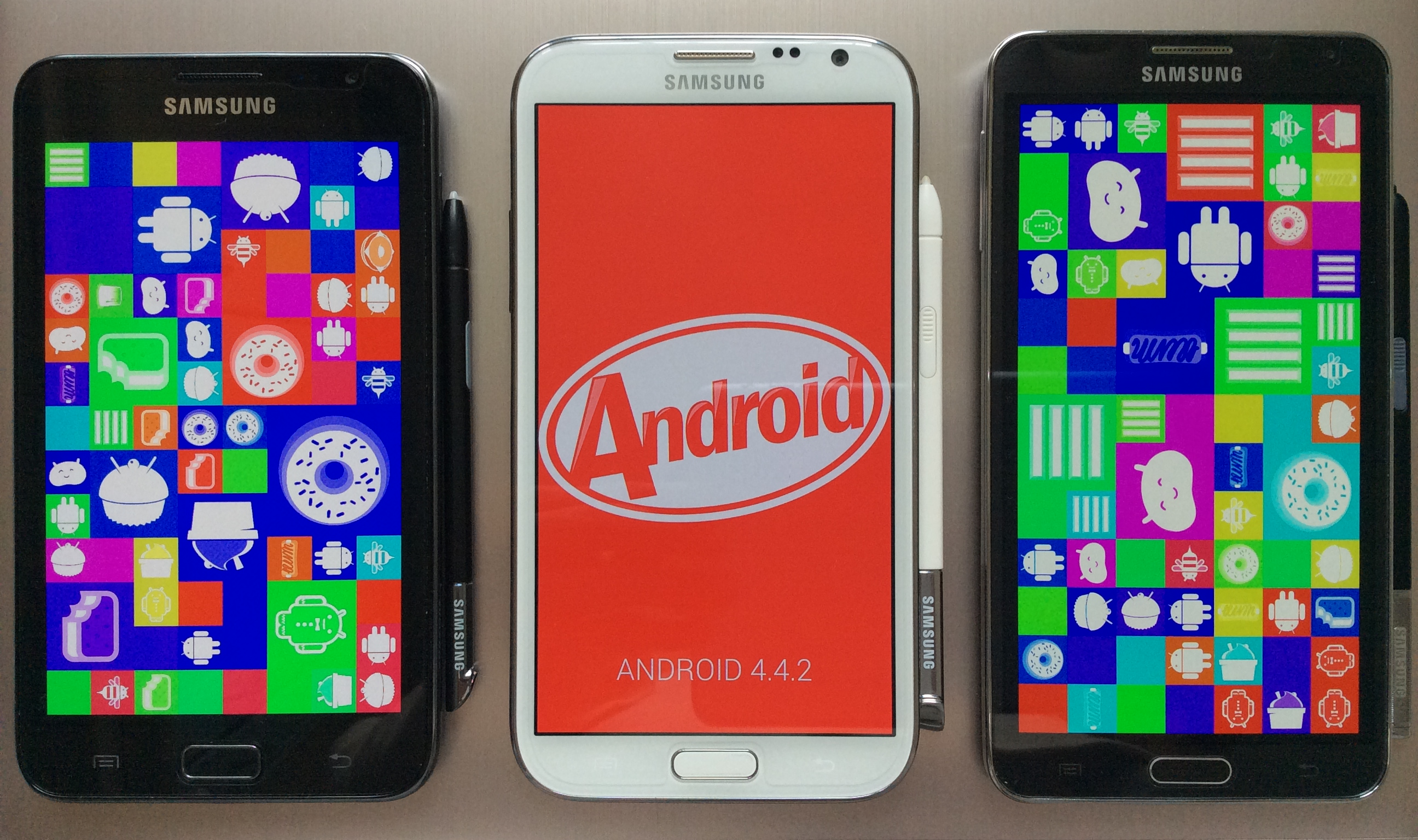

== Electronic paper ==
2004 Electronic paper:

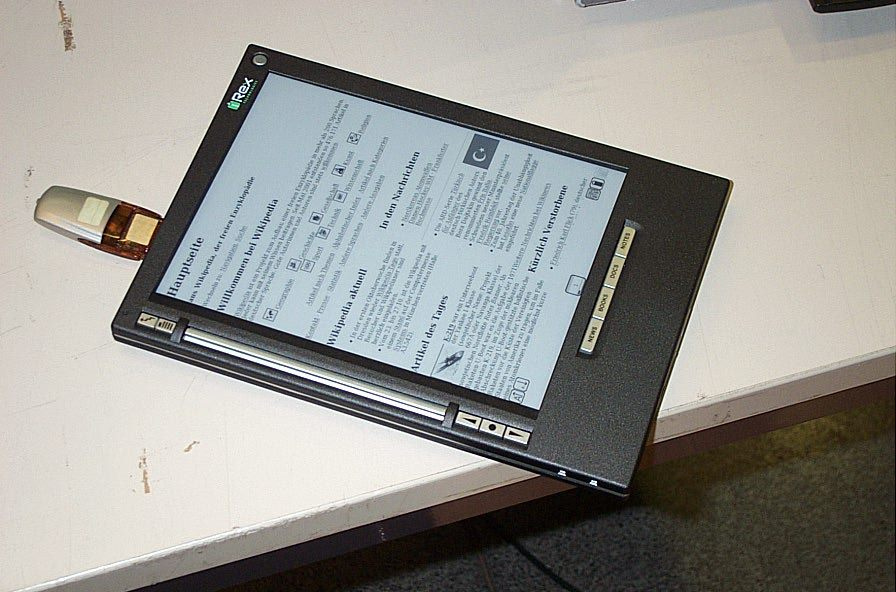
iLiad E-book reader equipped with e-paper display

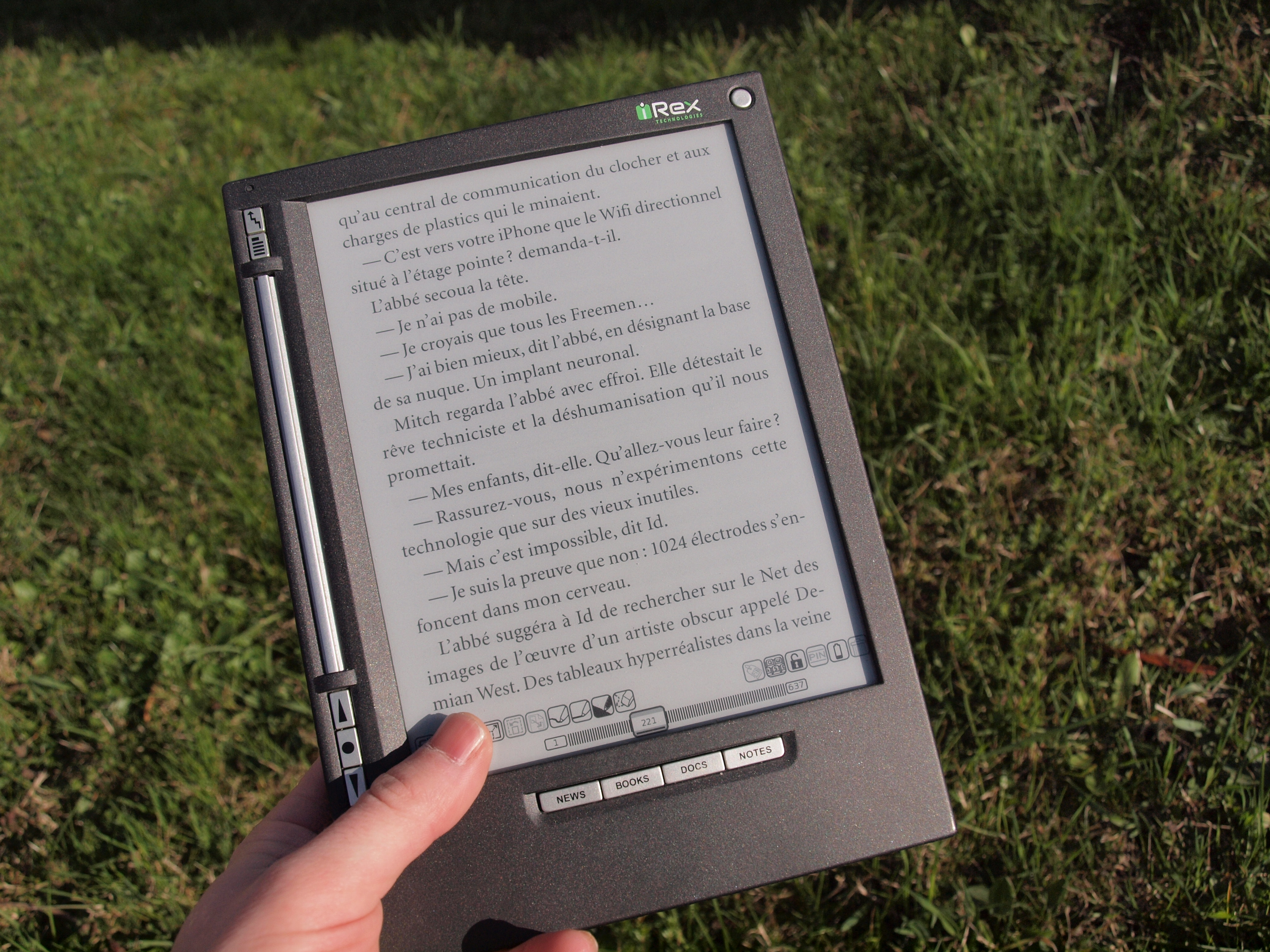
iLiad in sunlight

== See also ==
- Display device
