= Advanced Remote Display Station =

Early desktop storage-tube vector graphics terminal from 1968

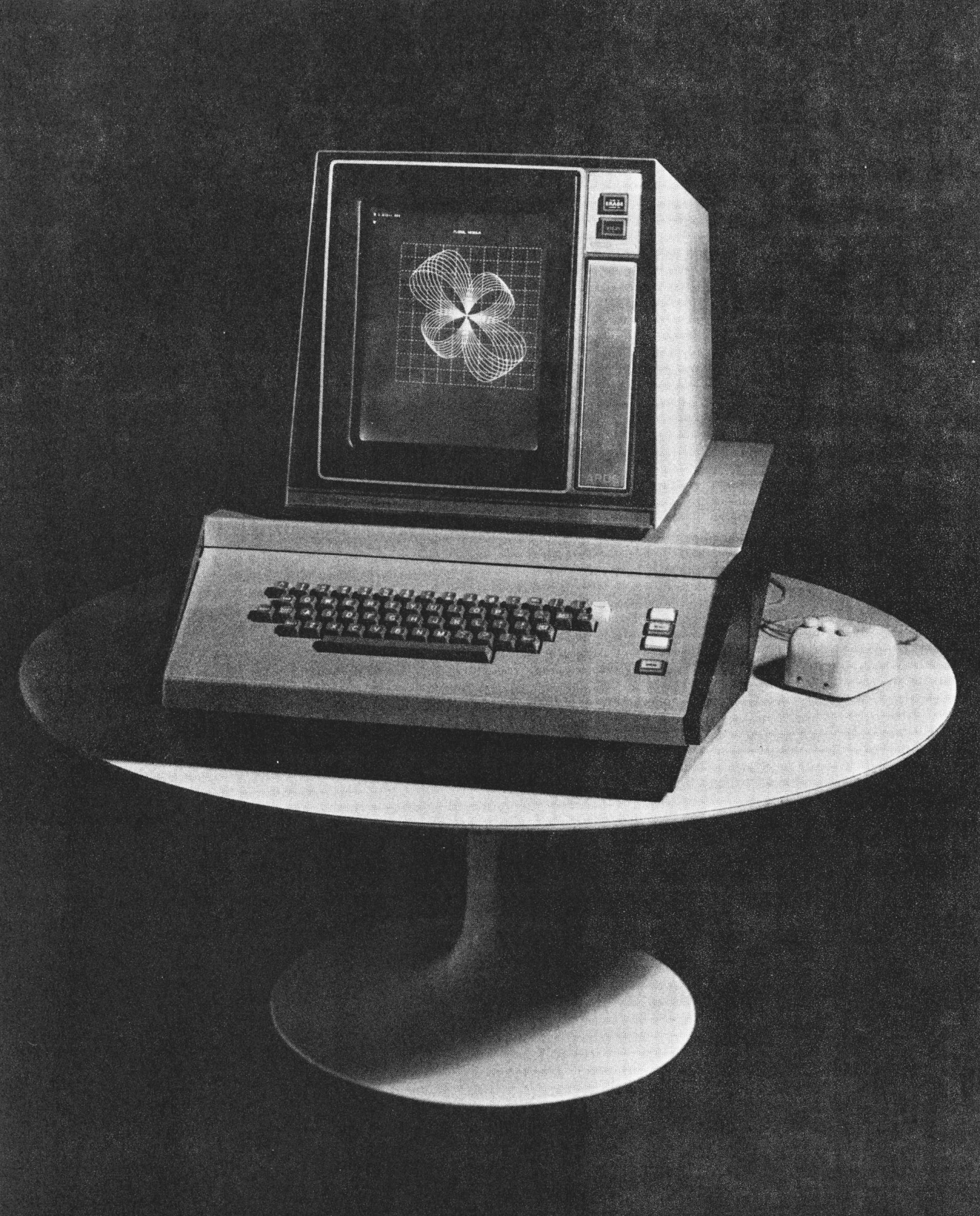
- ARDS desktop terminal with mouse.
- Developer: MIT's E.S.L. and Project MAC
- Manufacturer: Computer Displays, Inc.
- Type: desktop vector graphics and text display terminal
- Released: 1968; 56 years ago
- Introductory price: $12,750 (equivalent to about $114,675 in 2024)
- Display: Tektronix Type 611 storage tube
- Input: keyboard, mouse, joystick, graphics tablet

The Advanced Remote Display Station (also referred to as the ARDS) was a desktop storage-tube-based vector graphics and text terminal produced by Computer Displays, Inc. starting in 1968. It was announced at the 1968 Spring Joint Computer Conference and available by August 1968 for $12,750 (about $114,675 in 2024).

The ARDS was the first commercial product to include a computer mouse as an optional peripheral as early as April 1968 for an additional $1200 (about $10,793 in 2024).

The ARDS was capable of connecting to a computer remotely through a modem, or locally through an RS-232 cable. Computer Displays, Inc. also offered optional graphical input peripherals for the ARDS including a mouse and joystick.

== Development ==
The ARDS began development in early 1965 jointly by MIT's Electronic Systems Laboratory and Project MAC at MIT's CSAIL, with prototypes named the ARDS-I and ARDS-II prior to becoming a commercial product. The first ARDS-I prototype was completed in 1965; an early ARDS-II prototype was functional by May 1967, and was updated in August 1967 with the larger, final display CRT.

== Hardware ==
=== Display ===
The display of the commercially produced ARDS was a Tektronix Type 611 direct-view storage tube, meaning that once graphics or text were drawn onto the screen, they could not be erased individually without erasing the entire screen. This was attributed to the terminal's relatively low cost and intended remote use over narrow-bandwidth telephone lines. Filling the entire display with 4000 alphanumeric characters took about 33 seconds.

=== Mouse ===
The ARDS's mouse did not use a rolling ball to track movement, but rather two perpendicularly mounted wheels on the bottom and three buttons on top, much like the mouse used during The Mother of All Demos.

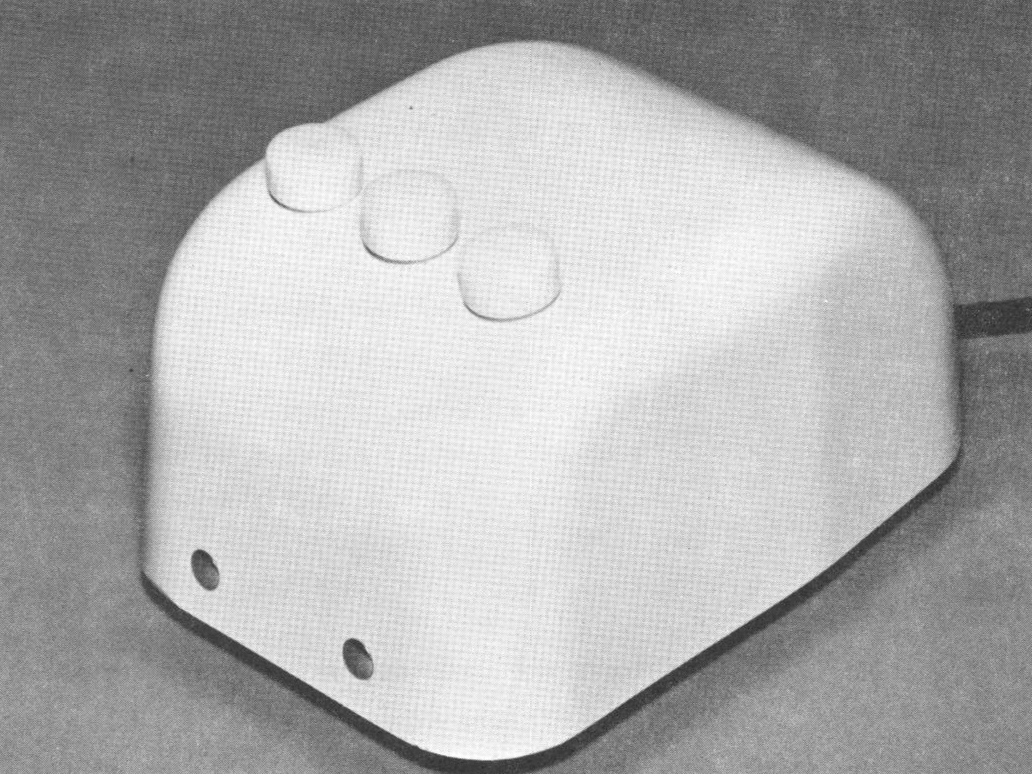
Top view of the ARDS's mouse.

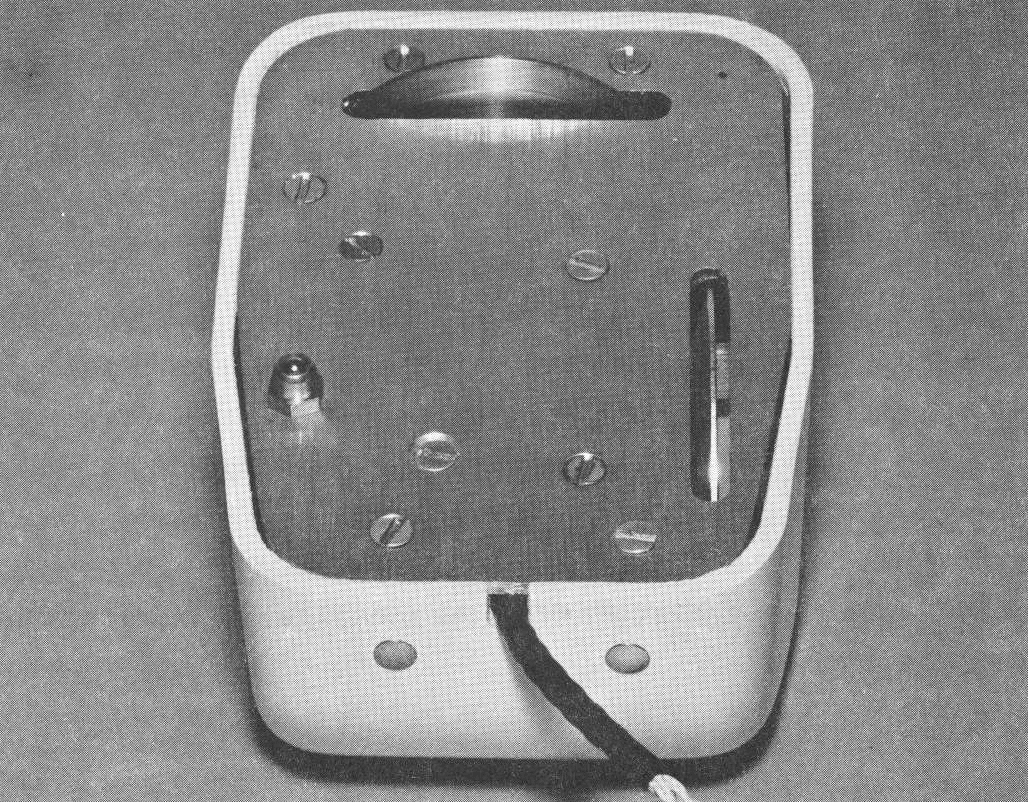
Bottom view of the ARDS's mouse.

== Other models ==
The ARDS 100A was released as the successor to the ARDS in 1969. It was priced at under $8000, much lower than the original ARDS. Along with the original ARDS's mouse and joystick, it added a graphics tablet as an input option.

Computer Displays, Inc. was acquired by Adage, another graphics terminal manufacturer, in 1970. By 1971, another ARDS model was being sold under Adage as the ARDS 100B.
