= D48 =

D48 or D-48 may refer to:

- 85 mm antitank gun D-48, a 1955 Soviet 85-mm calibre antitank gun
- D48 motorway, a road in the Czech Republic
- D48 road (Croatia)
- HMAS Sydney (D48), a Leander-class light cruiser of the Royal Australian Navy
- HMS Campania (D48), a Nairana-class escort carrier of the Royal Navy
- HMS Thane (D48), a Bogue-class escort carrier of the Royal Navy
- HMS Vidette (D48), a V-class destroyer of the Royal Navy
- Semi-Slav Defense, a chess opening
- D48, a precision color film recorder manufactured by Dicomed
- Captain Miller (film), working title D48, 2024 Indian film starring Dhanush
