= D47 =

D47 may refer to:

- D47 road (Croatia)
- Dithyrambe, D 47 (Schubert), a cantata by Franz Schubert
- HMS Delhi (D47), a Danae-class cruiser of the Royal Navy
- HMS Gabbard (D47), a Battle-class destroyer of the Royal Navy
- HMS Westcott (D47), a W-class destroyer of the Royal Navy
- Semi-Slav Defense, a chess opening
- D48, a precision color film recorder manufactured by Dicomed
