= Dicomed =

American computer graphics company (1969–1999)

Dicomed (or DICOMED) was a computer graphics technology company founded in 1969 and based in Minneapolis. In the early 1970s it became a leading manufacturer of precision color film recorders such as the D47 and D48.

The company went out of business in 1999.

== Products ==
One of Dicomed's first products was the D30, a digital image display utilizing a dark-trace CRT with a display resolution of 1024x1024, introduced in 1968. Even though it was capable of displaying any digitized image data, it was originally developed for the display of digitized medical X-ray images from x-ray films that were scanned and image-processed digitally (in order to enhance contrast and other parameters) via computer and stored on 9-track computer tape. A tape drive (or a computer itself) could then be interfaced to a D30 in order to display the processed image data.

The D30's dark-trace CRT made it possible for it to display an image continuously without the need for frame buffer memory (as that era's solid-state RAM memory devices were quite new and expensive, and the core memories also of the same era were limited in capacity) to refresh the image from periodically as is the case for a standard phosphor-based CRT, for the image would be retained on the CRT's scotophor layer of the screen until cleared by heating it. This type of CRT is very similar in function to the DVBST CRT used by later graphics terminals such as the Tektronix 4010.

Dicomed would later produce several CRT-based film recorders, interfaced to computers to record graphic output from the computer's memory to film. Many of the early government (JPL, NCAR, NSA, CIA, Sandia Laboratories, et al.) computer graphics applications had their imagery in output to a Dicomed. Most of these entities also had CRAY super computers with enough power to compute 4096 X 4096 color imagery.

A major role for the Dicomed D148 color film recorder, in 1984, was to image the work of 26 computer graphic animation specialists on to film for the production of the 15 minute IMAX film; the "Magic Egg".

Later in the 1980s, Dicomed became a producer of color workstations (D38, Producer, Imaginator, etc.) for artists and illustrators to create digital color imagery.

In the mid-1990s, Dicomed was a manufacturer of digital cameras.
