= Tektronix 4050 =

1970s series of desktop computers

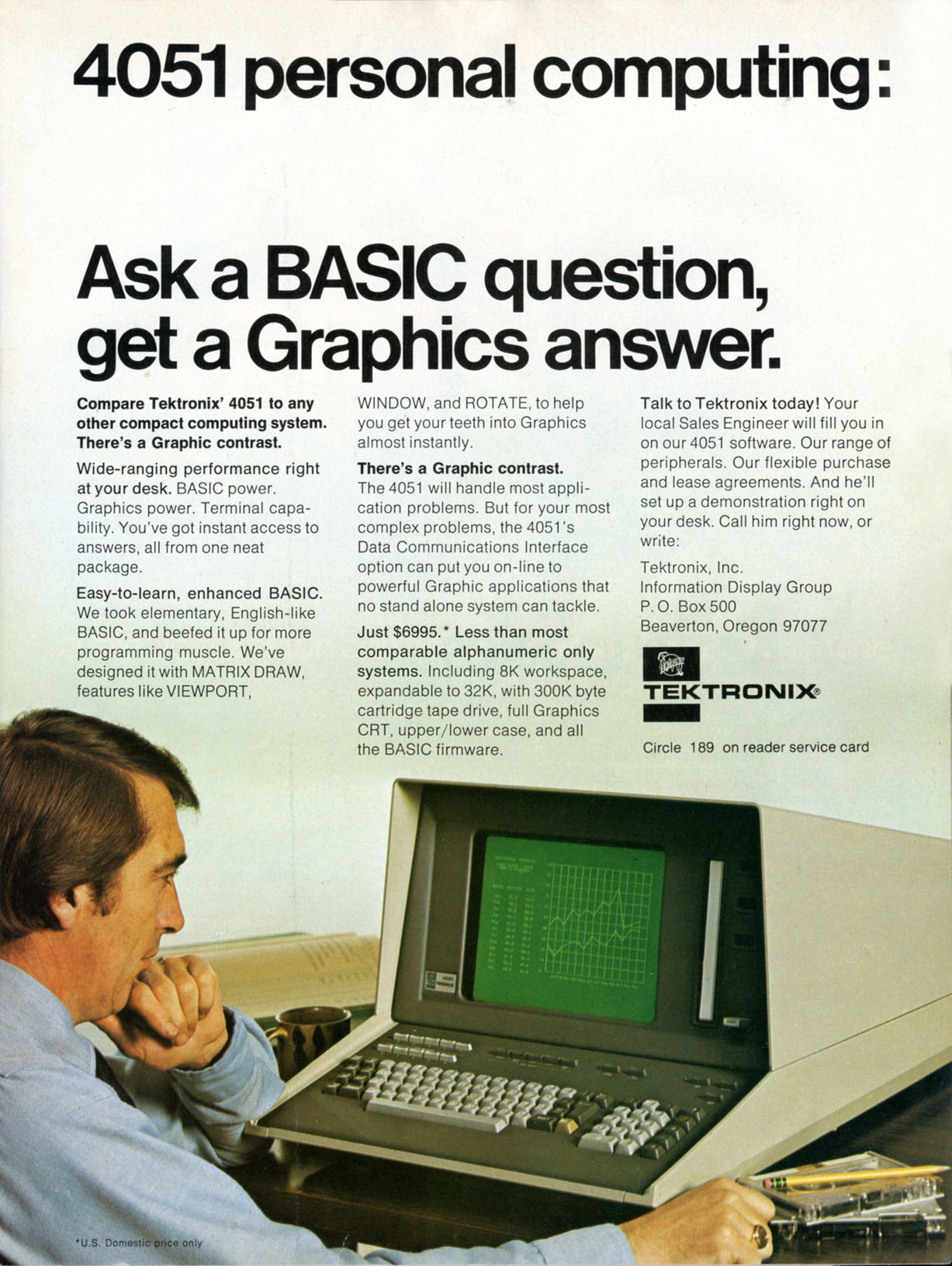
Tektronix 4051 computer

The Tektronix 4050 is a series of three desktop computers produced by Tektronix in the late 1970s through the early 1980s. The display technology is similar to the Tektronix 4010 terminal, using a storage tube display to avoid the need for video RAM. They are all-in-one designs with the display, keyboard, CPU and DC300 tape drive in a single desktop case. They also include a GPIB parallel bus interface for controlling lab and test equipment as well as connecting to external peripherals. A simple operating system and BASIC interpreter are included in ROM.

A key concept of the systems is the use of a storage tube for the display. This allows the screen to retain images drawn to it, eliminating the need for a framebuffer, computer memory devoted to the display. Most systems of the era had limited resolution due to the expense of the buffer needed to hold higher resolution images, but this is eliminated in the 4050s and allows the resolution to be as high as the hardware can handle, which was ostensibly 1024 by 1024 but limited by the physical layout of the screen to 1024 by 780. It also allows the machine to dedicate all of its memory to the programs running on it, as opposed to partitioning off a section for the buffer.

== Models ==
The first model, the 4051, was based on 8-bit Motorola 6800 running at a 1 MHz. It normally shipped with 8 KB of RAM and was expandable using 8 KB modules to 32 KB. The remaining 32 KB of address space was reserved for ROM, which could be expanded using two external ROM cartridge of 8 KB each. It included six character sets in ROM and an extended dialect of BASIC that included various vector drawing commands. The 4051 was released in 1975 for the base price of US$5,995 (equivalent to $35,870 in 2025). Adding the optional RS-232 interface allowed it to emulate a Tektronix 4012 terminal.

The second model was the 4052, which in spite of the similar name was a very different system. This had a CPU based on four AMD 2901 4-bit bit-slice processors used together to make a single 16-bit processor. It could also be used in a 6800-compatible mode, allowing it to run software from the 4051, although it did so much faster than the original 4051. Released in 1978, it came with a full 32 KB of RAM for US$9,795 (equivalent to $48,350 in 2025), and could be expanded to 64 KB for another US$1,995 (equivalent to $9,850 in 2025).

The 4054 was a version of the 4052 built around the 19" screen from the 4014 terminal rather than the 11" screen from the 4012, increasing resolution to 4096 by 3072.

== Peripherals ==
External storage units were available:

- The 4924 was an external version of the internal DC300 tape drive.
- The 4907 used single or dual Shugart 851R 8-inch floppy drives with 64 KB floppies.
- The larger, 2-drawer-filing-cabinet-sized 4909 storage unit used a CDC 96 megabyte hard drive with the first 16 megabytes in the form of a removable disc-pack.

Two sizes of the 4956 graphics tablet (20"x20", 36"x48") offered a slow process for inputting from paper drawings. The 4952 joystick was used for graphics input.

== Software ==
The graphic display software was based upon software originally developed in the 1960s by Corning Glass Works for their Type 904 graphics terminal. The display for this system had characteristics to the similar to those of Tektronix storage tube display. It used small pixel regions composed of photosensitive glass, which could be darkened (forming a black line image) by writing, and would display this persistently until the entire display was erased. When Corning left the market this software base was sold to Tektronix.

The original demo included an artillery game which was later adapted by high school students at Lindbergh High School in Renton, Washington to the HP 9830, and also adapted by Hewlett-Packard for the HP 2647 intelligent graphics terminal demo tape and eventually similar games in Microsoft BASIC for the IBM PC. Other games for the Tektronix included Weather Wars, with users directing lightning bolts and tornados against opponents in an environment affected by wind.

== Theatrical use ==
Because the direct view storage tubes do not flicker as do conventional CRTs, and because the BASIC programming interface allowed simple, rapid rendering of vector graphic displays, the 405x series were used in many theatrical contexts. In particular, 405x computers can frequently be seen in the 1978 TV series Battlestar Galactica.
