= Skiatron =

Type of 1940s information display

A skiatron being used by a British radar operator.

The skiatron is a type of cathode ray tube (CRT) that replaces the conventional phosphor with some type of scotophor, typically potassium chloride.

When hit by the electron beam from the back of the CRT, this normally white material turns a magenta color, producing a dark spot or line on the display. The pattern remains on the display until erased by heating the potassium chloride layer.

Skiatrons were used as an early form of projection television display, particularly in radar stations during World War II. These tubes are also sometimes known as dark trace CRTs or dark trace tubes.

== Description ==
During World War II, radar displays using potassium chloride evaporated on a mica plate as target material were actively developed in England, Germany, the United States, and the Soviet Union. Being naturally cathodochromic, potassium chloride did not require any special processing or treatment to become a CRT target material.

When hit by the electron beam from the back of the CRT, this normally white material turns a magenta color, producing a dark spot or line on the display, which resulted in the term "dark trace" being applied to these devices. The pattern remains on the display until erased by heating the potassium chloride layer. This physical property is known as tenebrescence or reversible photochromism.

Skiatrons were used as an early form of projection television display, particularly in radar stations during World War II. The skiatron was mounted below a translucent plotting table surface and brightly lit with mercury arc stage lights. The image on the surface reflected onto the bottom of the plotting table, using a spherical mirror and a Schmidt corrector plate, in the same fashion as an opaque projector, producing an image of the radar display at a much larger size. (Note: During WWII, CRTs were typically between 3 and 6 inches, these displays were on the order of several feet across.) In RAF stations, the surface had a map on it, in Royal Navy ships it was normally a series of radial lines. Operators viewing the surface would place markers on the projected traces, adding new markers as the traces moved. This produced trails of markers making the path of the targets clear.

A variety of methods were used to erase the skiatrons. UK radars used fans to cool the tubes which were being heated by the stage lighting of the projectors. Simply turning off the fans made the tube begin to warm up, the erasure taking perhaps 10 to 20 seconds. German examples used a thin, transparent layer of tungsten deposited on the front of the tube, which heated up when current was passed through it. This provided much faster erasing.

== Post-war developments ==
After the war, skiatrons were also used for storage oscilloscopes, which were viewed directly instead of as a projection system. Some examples included separate areas on the screen covered with potassium chloride or phosphor, allowing the display to be set up on the phosphor section and then recorded on the skiatron section. There was some interest in the post-war era using skiatrons for large-format projection televisions, but no known commercial use can be found.

Even the use in radar was not widespread; looking for an even larger format system with better properties, the RAF turned to the Photographic Display Unit, a system that took a photograph of the display, rapidly processed it, and then projected it through a modified movie projector. Even with this complexity, it was faster than the skiatrons, producing a new image every 15 seconds while the skiatron units were typically longer due to the erasure process.
