= Direct-view bistable storage tube =

CRT technology

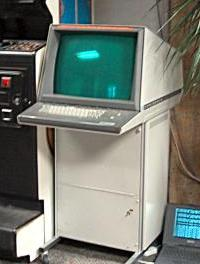
Tektronix 4014 with a "DVBST" storage display screen

Direct-view bistable storage tube (DVBST) was an acronym used by Tektronix to describe their line of storage tubes. These were cathode-ray tubes (CRT) that stored information written to them using an analog technique inherent in the CRT and based upon the secondary emission of electrons from the phosphor screen itself. The resulting image was visible in the continuously glowing patterns on the face of the CRT.

DVBST technology was anticipated by Andrew Haeff of the US Naval Research Laboratory, and by Williams and Kilburn in the late 1940s. Tek's (Tektronix) Robert H. Anderson refined Haeff's concepts in the late 1950s to produce a reliable and simple DVST.

== Principle ==
The DVBST implements two electron guns: a "flood gun" and a "writing gun". The writing gun scans across a wire grid, charging the grid to create the negative image. The flood gun then floods the grid. Previously charged areas repel the incoming electrons so that electrons only pass through the grid to the phosphor in those areas not previously charged.

The technology offered several advantages and disadvantages.

=== Advantages ===
- No refreshing is needed.
- Very complex pictures can be displayed at very high resolution without flicker.
- The cost is much lower.

=== Disadvantages ===
- They ordinarily do not display color.
- Selected part of the picture can not be erased.
- The erasing and redrawing process can take several seconds for complex pictures.
- No animation in DVST.
- Modifying any part of image requires redrawing of entire image.

== Applications ==
Tektronix-made DVBSTs were used for analog oscilloscopes (first in the 564 oscilloscope, then the type 601 monitor (1968), the 611 monitor, the 7313 and 7514 plug-in mainframe oscilloscope, all from Tektronix) and for computer terminals such as the archetypal Tek 4010 and its several successors including the Tektronix 4014. Portions of the screen are individually written-to by a conventional electron beam gun, and "flooded" by a wide, low velocity electron gun. Erasure required erasing the entire screen in a bright flash of green light, leading to the nickname "the mean green flashin' machine".

Some DVBST implementations also allowed the "write-through" of a small amount of dynamically refreshed, non-stored data. This allowed the display of cursors, graphic elements under construction, and the like on computer terminals.

== Skiatron ==
An alternate solution for storage tubes was the "dark trace" CRT, also known as the skiatron. This CRT replaced the conventional light-emitting phosphor layer on the face of the tube screen with a scotophor such as potassium chloride (KCl). KCl has the property that when a crystal is struck by an electron beam, that spot would change from translucent white to a dark magenta color. By backlighting such a CRT with a white or green circular fluorescent lamp, the resulting image would appear as black information against a green background or as magenta information against a white background. A benefit, aside from the semi-permanent storage of the displayed image, is that the brightness of the resultant display is only limited by the illumination source and optics.

The image would be retained until erased by flooding the scotophor with a high-intensity infrared light or by electro-thermal heating. Using conventional deflection and raster formation circuitry, a bi-level image could be created on the membrane and retained even when power was removed from the CRT. By using an array of dots, say 8 × 8, a larger pixel could be formed to represent 64 gray levels. One such device, the D36 Image Display, was made by DICOMED Corporation and a technical paper was presented at the 1972 Electro-Optical Conference in Geneva, Switzerland.

== Patents ==
- U.S. patent 3,293,473 1962 Anderson
