= Tektronix 4105 =

Computer video terminal

The Tektronix 4105 was a video terminal introduced by Tektronix in 1983. It could be used as a conventional text terminal supporting the ANSI escape codes of the VT102 or the VT52, as well as a graphics terminal using their own Tektronix 4010 series vector graphics. In graphics mode resolution was relatively limited, at 480 by 360 pixels, but it added a wide variety of new commands to the original 4010 set, including up to eight colors on the screen. The color commands would become a standard in their own right, and is supported by most terminal emulators supporting the Tek 4010 series.
