= Scotophor =

A scotophor is a material showing reversible darkening and bleaching when subjected to certain types of radiation. The name means dark bearer, in contrast to phosphor, which means light bearer. Scotophors show tenebrescence (reversible photochromism) and darken when subjected to an intense radiation such as sunlight. Minerals showing such behavior include hackmanite sodalite, spodumene and tugtupite. Some pure alkali halides also show such behavior.

Scotophors can be sensitive to light, particle radiation (e.g. electron beam – see cathodochromism), X-rays, or other stimuli. The induced absorption bands in the material, caused by F-centers created by electron bombardment, can be returned to their non-absorbing state, usually by light and/or heating.

Scotophors sensitive to electron beam radiation can be used instead of phosphors in cathode ray tubes, for creating a light absorbing instead of light emitting image. Such displays are viewable in bright light and the image is persistent, until erased.

The image would be retained until erased by flooding the scotophor with a high-intensity infrared light or by electro-thermal heating. Using conventional deflection and raster formation circuitry, a bi-level image could be created on the membrane and retained even when power was removed from the CRT.

In Germany, scotophor tubes were developed by Telefunken as blauschrift-röhre ("dark-trace tube"). The heating mechanism was a layer of mica with transparent thin film of tungsten. When the image was to be erased, current was applied to the tungsten layer; even very dark images could be erased in 5–10 seconds.

Scotophors typically require a higher-intensity electron beam to change color than phosphors need to emit light. Screens with layers of a scotophor and a phosphor are therefore possible, where the phosphor, flooded with a dedicated wide-beam low-intensity electron gun, produces backlight for the scotophor, and optionally highlights selected areas of the screen if bombarded with electrons with higher energy but still insufficient to penetrate the phosphor and change the scotophor state.

The main application of scotophors was in plan position indicators, specialized military radar displays. The achievable brightness allowed projecting the image to a larger surface. The ability to quickly record a persistent trace found its use in some oscilloscopes.

== Materials ==
Potassium chloride is used as a scotophor with designation P10 in dark-trace CRTs (also called dark trace tubes, color center tubes, cathodochromic displays or scotophor tubes), e.g. in the Skiatron. This CRT replaced the conventional light-emitting phosphor layer on the face of the tube screen with a scotophor such as potassium chloride (KCl). Potassium chloride has the property that when a crystal is struck by an electron beam, that spot would change from translucent white to a dark magenta color. By backlighting such a CRT with a white or green circular fluorescent lamp, the resulting image would appear as black information against a green background or as magenta information against a white background. A benefit, aside from the semi-permanent storage of the displayed image, is that the brightness of the resultant display is only limited by the illumination source and optics. The F-centers, however, have tendency to aggregate, and the screen needs to be heated to fully erase the image.

The image on KCl can be formed by depositing a charge of over 0.3 microcoulomb per square centimeter, by an electron beam with energy typically at 8–10 keV. The erasure can be achieved in less than a second by heating the scotophor at 150 °C.

KCl was the most common scotophor used. Other halides show the same property; potassium bromide absorbs in bluish end of the spectrum, resulting in a brown trace, sodium chloride produces a trace that is colored more towards orange.

Another scotophor used in dark-trace CRTs is a modified sodalite, fired in reducing atmosphere or having some chlorides substituted with sulfate ions. Its advantage against KCl is its higher writing speed, less fatigue, and the F-centers do not aggregate, therefore it is possible to substantially erase the screen with light only, without heating.

== See also ==
- Solarization (disambiguation)
- Photochromism
