= Solarization =

Solarization or solarisation may also refer to:

- Solarization (photography), a photographic effect caused by severe overexposure
- Solarization (physics), a phenomenon in physics where a material undergoes a temporary change in color after being subjected to high-energy electromagnetic radiation, such as ultraviolet light or X-rays
- Soil solarization, method for controlling pests using solar power to increase the soil temperature
- "Solarization", a song by Shorty Rogers from the 1957 album Way Up There
- "Solarisation", a song by Kenny Clarke/Francy Boland Big Band from the 1969 album Faces
- "Solarization", a song by Billy Cobham from the 1974 album Total Eclipse
- "Solarization", a song by Fredrik Thordendal from the 1997 album Sol Niger Within

== See also ==
- Sabattier effect, a photographic tone reversal technique also known as pseudo-solarization
- Solarize, a 2018 album by Capital Cities
- Solarized, a color scheme
- Solarized (album), a 2004 album by Ian Brown
