= Storage tube =

CRTs designed for use as computer memory

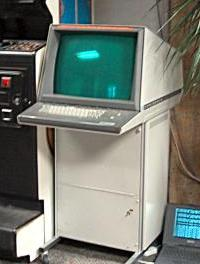
The Tektronix 4014 uses a storage tube for its display.

Storage tubes are a class of cathode-ray tubes (CRTs) that are designed to hold an image for a long period of time, typically as long as power is supplied to the tube.

A specialized type of storage tube, the Williams tube, was used as a main memory system on a number of early computers, from the late 1940s into the early 1950s. They were replaced with other technologies, notably core memory, starting in the 1950s.

In a new form, the bistable tube, storage tubes made a comeback in the 1960s and 1970s for use in computer graphics, most notably the Tektronix 4010 series. Today they are obsolete, their functions provided by low-cost memory devices and liquid crystal displays.

== Operation ==
=== Background ===
A conventional CRT consists of an electron gun at the back of the tube that is aimed at a thin layer of phosphor at the front of the tube. Depending on the role, the beam of electrons emitted by the gun is steered around the display using magnetic (television) or electrostatic (oscilloscope) means. When the electrons strike the phosphor, the phosphor "lights up" at that location for a time, and then fades away. The length of time the spot remains is a function of the phosphor chemistry.

At very low energies, electrons from the gun will strike the phosphor and nothing will happen. As the energy is increased, it will reach a critical point, $V_{cr1}$, that will activate the phosphor and cause it to give off light. As the voltage increases beyond V_{cr1} the brightness of the spot will increase. This allows the CRT to display images with varying intensity, like a television image.

Above V_{cr1} another effect also starts, secondary emission. When any insulating material is struck by electrons over a certain critical energy, electrons within the material are forced out of it through collisions, increasing the number of free electrons. This effect is used in electron multipliers as found in night vision systems and similar devices. In the case of a CRT this effect is generally undesirable; the new electrons generally fall back to the display and cause the surrounding phosphor to light up, which appears as a lowering of the focus of the image.

The rate of secondary emission is also a function of the electron beam energy, but follows a different rate curve. As the electron energy is increased, the rate increases until it reaches a critical threshold, V_{cr2} when the number of secondary emissions is greater than the number supplied by the gun. In this case the localized image rapidly fades as energy leaving the display through secondary electrons is greater than the rate it is being supplied by the gun.

In any CRT, images are displayed by striking the screen with electron energies between these two values, V_{cr1} and V_{cr2}. Below V_{cr1} no image is formed, and above V_{cr2} any image rapidly fades.

Another side effect, initially a curiosity, is that electrons will stick to the phosphor in lit up areas. As the light emission fades, these electrons are likewise released back into the tube. The charge is generally far too small to have a visual effect, and was generally ignored in the case of displays.

=== Storage ===
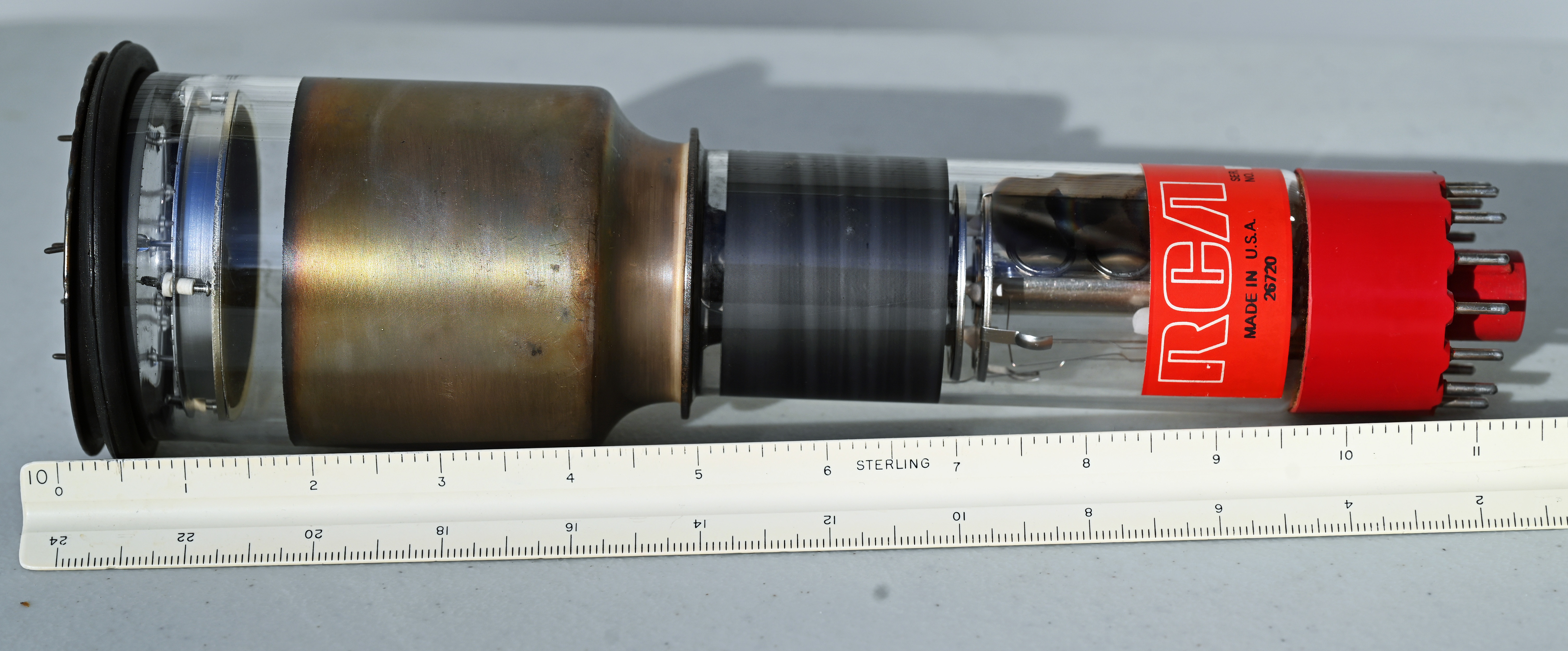
RCA 6499 Radechon tube used for electrostatic storage in SAGE computers

These two effects were both utilized in the construction of a storage tube. Storage was accomplished by striking the screen with electrons with energies just above V_{cr1}, and erased by striking them with electrons above V_{cr2}. There were any number of varieties of mechanical layouts used to improve focus or cause the image to be refreshed either internally to the tube or through off board storage.

The easiest example to understand are the early computer memory systems as typified by the Williams tube. These consisted of World War II surplus radar display CRTs connected to a computer. The X and Y deflection plates were connected to amplifiers that converted memory locations into X and Y positions on the screen.

To write a value to memory, the address was amplified and sent to the Y deflection plates, such that the beam would be fixed to a horizontal line on the screen. A time base generator then set the X deflection plate to increasing voltages, causing the beam to be scanned across the selected line. In this respect, it is similar to a conventional television scanning a single line. The gun was set to a default energy close to V_{cr1}, and the bits from the computer fed to the gun to modulate the voltage up and down such that 0's would be below V_{cr1} and 1's above it. By the time the beam reached the other side of the line, a pattern of a short dash was drawn for each 1, while each 0 was represented by a short dot with a trailing uncharged area. This way of encoding ensured a reference signal was always present. The bits were uniformly spaced and separated by uncharged safety margins.

To read the values back out, the deflections plates were set to the same values, but the gun energy set to a value above V_{cr2}. As the beam scanned the line, the phosphor was pushed well beyond the secondary emission threshold. If the beam was located over a blank area, a certain number of electrons would be released, but if it was over a lit area, the number would be increased by the number of electrons previously stuck to that area. In the Williams tube, these values were read by measuring the capacitance of a metal plate just in front of the display side of the tube. Electrons leaving the front of the CRT hit the plate and changed its charge. As the reading process also erased any stored values, the signal had to be regenerated through associated circuitry. A CRT with two electron guns, one for reading and one for writing, made this process trivial.

=== Imaging systems ===
The earliest computer graphics systems, like those of the TX-2 and DEC PDP-1, required the entire attention of the computer to maintain. A list of points stored in main memory was periodically read out to the display to refresh it before the image faded. This generally occurred frequently enough that there was little time to do anything else, and interactive systems like Spacewar! were tour-de-force programming efforts.

For practical use, graphical displays were developed that contained their own memory and an associated very simple computer which offloaded the refreshing task from the mainframe. This was not inexpensive; the IBM 2250 graphics terminal used with the IBM S/360 cost $280,000 in 1970.

A storage tube could replace most or all of the localized hardware by storing the vectors directly within the display, instead of an associated local computer. Commands that previously caused the terminal to erase its memory and thus clear the display could be emulated by scanning the entire screen at an energy above V_{cr2}. In most systems, this caused the entire screen to quickly "flash" before clearing to a blank state. The two main advantages were:

- Very low bandwidth needs compared to vector graphics displays, thus allowing much longer cable distances between computer and terminal
- No need for display-local RAM (as in modern terminals), which was prohibitively expensive at the time.

Generally speaking, storage tubes could be divided into two categories. In the more common category, they were only capable of storing "binary" images; any given point on the screen was either illuminated or dark. The Tektronix Direct-View Bistable Storage Tube was perhaps the best example in this category. Other storage tubes were able to store greyscale/halftoned images; the tradeoff was usually a much-reduced storage time.

Some pioneering storage tube displays were MIT Project MAC's ARDS (Advanced Remote Display Station), the Computek 400 Series Display terminals (a commercial derivative), which both used a Tektronix type 611 storage display unit, and Tektronix's 4014 terminal, the latter becoming a de facto computer terminal standard some time after its introduction (later being emulated by other systems due to this status).

The first generalized computer assisted instruction system, PLATO I, c. 1960 on ILLIAC I, used a storage tube as its computer graphics display. PLATO II and PLATO III also used storage tubes as displays.

== See also ==
- Direct-View Bistable Storage Tube (DVBST), Tektronix's implementation of a Storage tube
- Cathode-ray tube § Image storage tubes for an explanation of how analog storage tubes work
- Williams tube and Selectron tube both used the term "storage tube" for early computer memory devices
- Electronic paper
- Tektronix 4050 used a storage tube to eliminate the need for framebuffer memory
