= Electron-beam technology =

Devices using beams of free electrons

Since the mid-20th century, electron-beam technology has provided the basis for a variety of novel and specialized applications in semiconductor manufacturing, microelectromechanical systems, nanoelectromechanical systems, and microscopy.

== Mechanism ==
Free electrons in a vacuum can be manipulated by electric and magnetic fields to form a fine beam. Where the beam collides with solid-state matter, electrons are converted into heat or kinetic energy. This concentration of energy in a small volume of matter can be precisely controlled by the fields, which brings many advantages.

== Applications ==
Electron beam techniques include electron probe microanalysis, transmission electron microscopy, auger spectroscopy, and scanning electron microscopy. The rapid increase of temperature at the location of impact can quickly melt a target material. In extreme working conditions, the rapid temperature increase can lead to evaporation, making an electron beam an excellent tool in heating applications, such as welding or electron beam evaporation. Electron beam technology is used in cable-isolation treatment, in electron lithography of sub-micrometer and nano-dimensional images, in microelectronics for electron-beam curing of color printing and for the fabrication and modification of polymers, including liquid-crystal films, among many other applications.

=== Furnaces ===
In a vacuum, the electron beam provides a source of heat that can melt or modify any material. This source of heat or phase transformation is absolutely sterile due to the vacuum and scull of solidified metal around the cold copper crucible walls. This ensures that the purest materials can be produced and refined in electron-beam vacuum furnaces. Rare and refractory metals can be produced or refined in small-volume vacuum furnaces. For mass production of steels, large furnaces with capacity measured in metric tons and electron-beam power in megawatts exist in industrialized countries.

=== Welding ===
Since the beginning of electron-beam welding on an industrial scale at the end of the 1950s, countless electron-beam welders have been designed and are being used worldwide. These welders feature working vacuum chambers ranging from a few liters up to hundreds of cubic meters, with electron guns carrying power of up to 100 kW.

=== Surface treatments ===
Modern electron-beam welders are usually designed with a computer-controlled deflection system that can traverse the beam rapidly and accurately over a selected area of the work piece. Thanks to the rapid heating, only a thin surface layer of the material is heated. Applications include hardening, annealing, tempering, texturing, and polishing (with argon gas present). If the electron beam is used to cut a shallow trough in the surface, repeatedly moving it horizontally along the trough at high speeds creates a small pile of ejected melted metal. With repetition, spike structures of up to a millimeter in height can be created. These structures can aid bonding between different materials and modify the surface roughness of the metal.

=== Additive manufacturing ===
Additive manufacturing is the process of joining materials to make objects from 3D model data, usually by melting powder material layer upon layer. Melting in a vacuum by using a computer-controlled scanning electron beam is highly precise. Electron-beam direct manufacturing (DM) is the first commercially available, large-scale, fully programmable means of achieving near net shape parts.

=== Metal powder production ===
The source billet metal is melted by an electron beam while being spun vigorously. Powder is produced as the metal cools when flying off the metal bar.

=== Machining ===
Electron-beam machining is a process in which high-velocity electrons are concentrated into a narrow beam with a very high planar power density. The beam cross-section is then focused and directed toward the work piece, creating heat and vaporizing the material. Electron-beam machining can be used to accurately cut or bore a wide variety of metals. The resulting surface finish is better and kerf width is narrower than what can be produced by other thermal cutting processes. However, due to high equipment costs, the use of this technology is limited to high-value products.

=== Lithography ===
An electron lithograph is produced by a very finely focused electron beam, which creates micro-structures in the resist that can subsequently be transferred to the substrate material, often by etching. It was originally developed for manufacturing integrated circuits and is also used for creating nanotechnology architectures. Electron lithographs uses electron beams with diameters ranging from two nanometers up to hundreds of nanometers. The electron lithograph is also used to produce computer-generated holograms (CGH). Maskless electron lithography has found wide usage in photomask making for photolithography, low-volume production of semiconductor components, and research and development activities.

=== Physical-vapor-deposition solar-cell production ===
Physical vapor deposition takes place in a vacuum and produces a thin film of solar cells by depositing thin layers of metals onto a backing structure. Electron-beam evaporation uses thermionics emission to create a stream of electrons that are accelerated by a high-voltage cathode and anode arrangement. Electrostatic and magnetic fields focus and direct the electrons to strike a target. The kinetic energy is transformed into thermal energy at or near the surface of the material. The resulting heating causes the material to melt and then evaporate. Temperatures in excess of 3500 degrees Celsius can be reached. The vapor from the source condenses onto a substrate, creating a thin film of high-purity material. Film thicknesses from a single atomic layer to many micrometers can be achieved. This technique is used in microelectronics, optics, and material research, and to produce solar cells and many other products.

=== Curing and sterilization ===
Electron-beam curing is a method of curing paints and inks without the need for traditional solvent. Electron-beam curing produces a finish similar to that of traditional solvent-evaporation processes, but achieves that finish through a polymerization process. E-beam processing is also used to cross-link polymers to make them more resistant to thermal, mechanical or chemical stresses.

E-beam processing has been used for the sterilization of medical products and aseptic packaging materials for foods, as well as disinfestation, the elimination of live insects from grain, tobacco, and other unprocessed bulk crops.

=== Electron microscopes ===
An electron microscope uses a controlled beam of electrons to illuminate a specimen and produce a magnified image. Two common types are the scanning electron microscope (SEM) and the transmission electron microscope (TEM).

=== Medical radiation therapy ===
Electron beams impinging on metal produce X-rays. The X-rays may be diagnostic, e.g., dental or limb images. Often in these X-ray tubes the metal is a spinning disk so that it doesn't melt; the disk is spun in vacuum via a magnetic motor. The X-rays may also be used to kill cancerous tissue. The Therac-25 machine is an infamous example of this.

== History ==
Electron beam technology ultimately derives from work that led to the discovery of the electron at a time when electron beams were called cathode rays. Key advances in technology to control electron beams lead resulted in the first useful scanning electron microscope in 1952 by McMullan in Charles Oatley's lab at Cambridge University. A series of PhD students in that lab continued to improved the technique. Thomas Eugene Everhart, working mostly on semiconductor surfaces, developed the voltage contrast technique and the Everhart-Thornley detector.

== Bibliography ==
- Schultz, H.: Electron beam welding, Abington Publishing
- Von Dobeneck, D.: Electron Beam Welding – Examples of 30 Years of Job-Shop Experience
- elfik.isibrno.cz/en : Electron beam welding (in Czech and/or English)
- Visser, A.: Werkstoffabtrag durch Elektronen-und Photonenstrahlen; Verlag <Technische Rundschau>, Blaue Reihe, Heft 104
- Klein, J., Ed., Welding: Processes, Quality and Applications, Nova Science Publishers, Inc., N.Y., Chapters 1 and 2, pp. 1–166
- Nemtanu, M. R., Brasoveanu, M., Ed., Practical Aspects and applications of Electron Beam Irradiation, Transworld Research Network, 37/661(2), Fort P.O., Trivandrum-695 023, Kerala, India
