= Fil =

FIL or Fil may refer to:

== People ==
- Father-in-law
- Fil Barlow (born 1963), Australian cartoonist
- Fil Bo Riva (born 1993), Italian singer
- Fil Delacruz (born 1950), Filipino artist
- Fil Fraser (1932–2017), Canadian broadcaster, filmmaker, civil servant and educator
- Fil Hearn (born 1938), American architectural and art historian
- Joseph Fil (born 1953), American army general
- Svitlana Fil (born 1969), Soviet rower
- Zbigniew Fil (born 1977), Polish musician

== Sport ==
- Federation of International Lacrosse
- Florida Instructional League, an American baseball league
- Florida International League, a defunct American baseball league
- International Luge Federation

== Other uses ==
- Al-Fil, the 105th sura of the Qur'an
- Fidelity International Limited, an American investment management company
- FIL file (disambiguation)
- Filipino language
- Filmjölk, a Swedish fermented milk product
  - Viili, a variant
- Firestone Indy Lights, an American developmental automobile racing series
- Functional Imaging Laboratory, at University College London
- Guadalajara International Book Fair, (Spanish: Feria Internacional del Libro de Guadalajara)
- Filecoin, a cryptocurrency

== See also ==
- Fils (disambiguation)
- Fill (disambiguation)
