= Gold key (DEC) =

Computer keyboard key

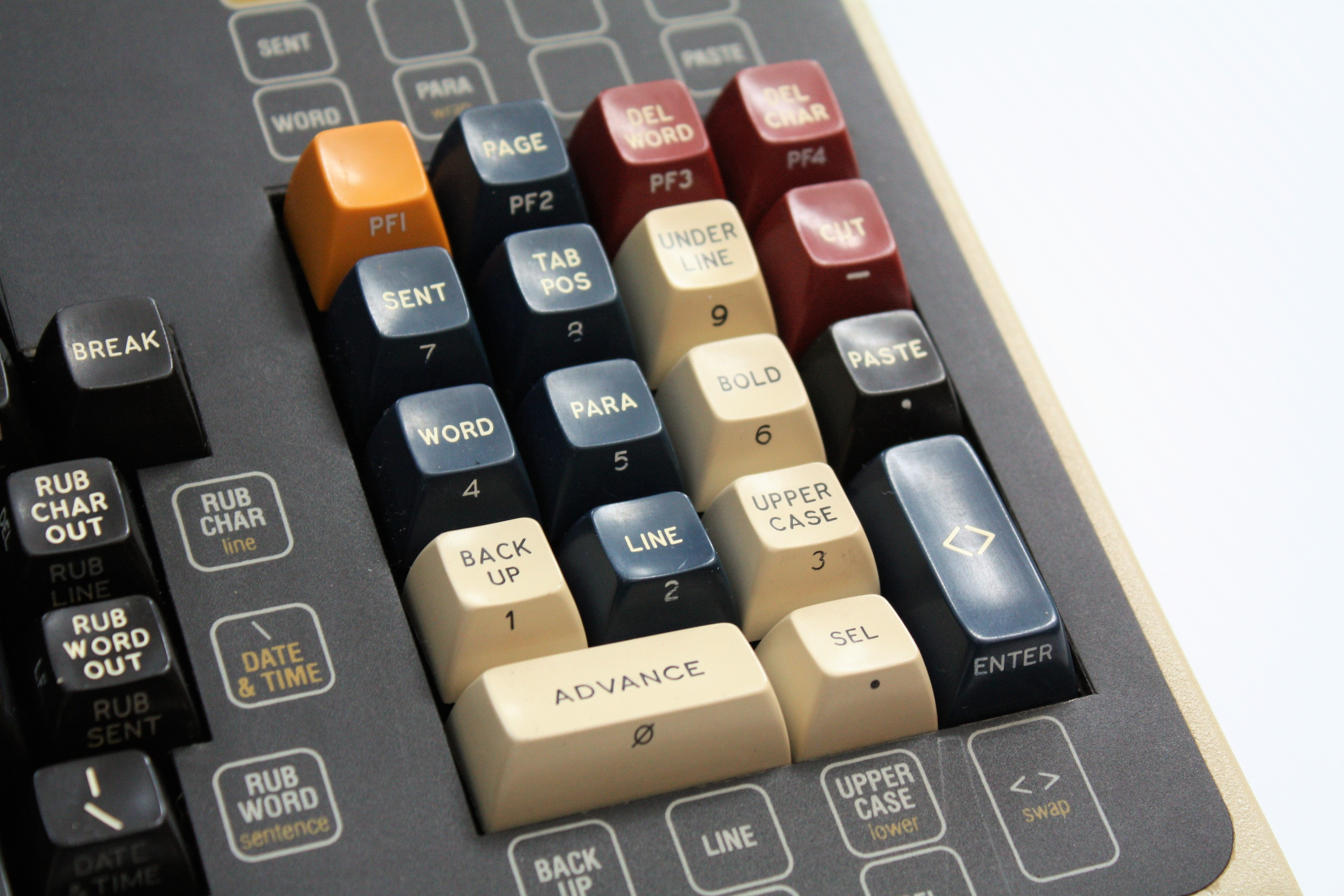
VT180 Robin WPS keyboard with Gold key in the upper left of its numeric keypad (alternate functions written in gold on the fronts of other keys)

The Gold key is a computer keyboard key used as a prefix to invoke a variety of single-key editing and formatting functions. Usually located in the top-left position of the numeric keypad on platforms such as the VT100, it is the signature element of a consistent user interface implemented by Digital Equipment Corporation (DEC) across multiple product lines.

It is used within WPS, EDT, and many other common VAX programs. The key, typically located as the upper leftmost key on the numeric keypad on different terminals, was not necessarily colored gold. Some DEC terminals would include keyboards where the gold key was labeled PF1, as on the VT100 and VT200, or was colored blue, as on the VT52. On some keyboards, the normal function of a key would be labeled on the lower portion of the key, while its alternate function activated with the GOLD key would be labeled above it.

== Usage ==
The Gold Key is used to invoke single-key functions which may be located on either the main keyboard or the numeric keypad. For example, on the WPS-8 word processing system, the main keyboard key C is marked "CENTR", in gold lettering, on its front surface; the keystrokes GOLDC invoke that word processing function to center the current line of text.

The Gold key is a prefix key, not a modifier key. A modifier key would be pressed and held while a second key is pressed; the Gold key is pressed and released before a second key is pressed and released. In that sense, DEC and compatible software uses the Gold key in the same way that Emacs uses the escape key.

== Origins ==
The base model VT50 terminal was equipped with a main keyboard only, and so had no Gold key. The model VT50H added a numeric keypad, including three unlabeled keys whose functions would be determined by whatever program was running. Located at the top left of the keypad, these were later named "PF" keys, and by convention, the first of them, PF1, became the Gold key.

The VT50H numeric keypad was of limited usefulness in editing because, from the perspective of the computer receiving its input, most of the keypad's keys were indistinguishable from their equivalents on the main keyboard. The VT52 terminal added an alternate keypad mode in which all keypad keys would send distinct character codes.

In his introduction to a 1990 DEC oral history presentation, Robert Everett, Fellow of the Computer History Museum, credited John T. (Jack) Gilmore with "designing Digital's gold keyboard interface".

== Classic software ==
Software using Gold key keyboard functions was developed across multiple generations of DEC computers.

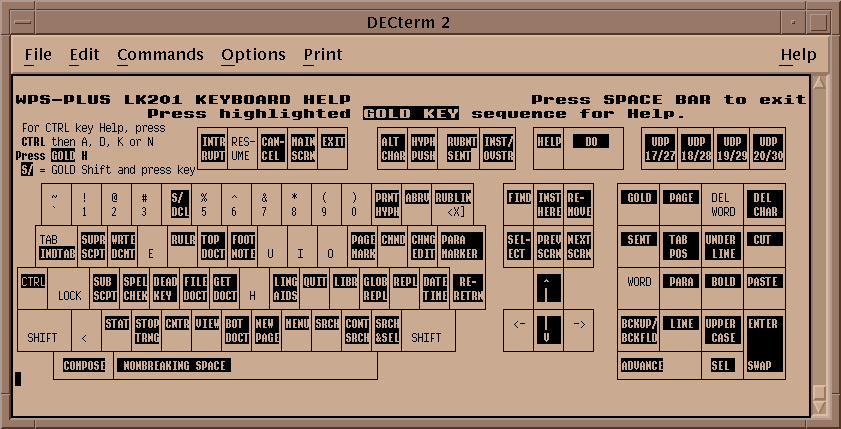
ALL-IN-1 WPS-Plus keyboard layout; functions using the Gold key are shown on black background

PDP-8 processors ran the WPS-8 word processing software package on several models of one- and two-user dedicated "word station" systems.

PDP-11 processors running RT-11 used the KED/KEX editors.

VAXen running VMS used the EDT editor, initially with either the VT52 or the VT100 (which have slightly different keypads).

Alpha AXP RISC processors running OpenVMS also used EDT, often with later-model terminals such as the VT220–VT420.

EDT recognizes an additional usage for the Gold key, to enter a repeat count. For example, the keystrokes GOLD20= enter a line of twenty equals signs. Repeat counts also apply to keypad editing commands, but if such a command itself requires the Gold key, the Gold key must be pressed again before the command key. For example, assuming a VT100 keypad, GOLDkeypad 6 perform the PASTE editing command (once), while GOLD4GOLDkeypad 6 performs PASTE four times. For editing commands which are directional, such as moving the cursor, negative repeat counts may be used to indicate reverse direction.

VAX and Alpha VMS systems supported the ALL-IN-1 office application suite, including the WPS-Plus word processor.

== Compatibility and continuity ==
Various hardware and software products have been produced to maintain compatibility with both the variety of legacy Gold key host systems and with the expertise and preferences of the many Gold key users.

At the same time that DEC was selling VAX-based WPS-Plus in the late 1980s, Exceptional Business Solutions of Culver City, California, sold a PC-based word processor named WPS-PC, "designed for users who have experience with the DEC family of Gold-key word processors and would rather fight than switch."

As personal computers began to replace serial terminals even in their core role of talking to central host computers, DEC itself supplied its new Rainbow PC with a Gold Key Country Kit for use with VAX ALL-IN-1.

Emacs offers an EDT emulator package which supports both physical and virtual VT100-style terminals. There is a slight complication for virtual (xterm-style) terminals which run on top of a host PC operating system, in that the Num Lock key cannot be remapped to the Gold key at the level of Emacs; instead, it is remapped at the level of the X server (instructions provided). As of the latest stable release of Emacs (2013), EDT and Gold key support is a current feature.

Note that software can never quite achieve full functional fidelity across desktop platforms simply because keypad hardware differs: the PC numeric keypad has only 17 keys, the VT100 terminal and LK201 keyboard each have 18 (not including arrow keys), and the VT52 numeric keypad has 19 keys.
