= Fill-in =

Fill-in can refer to:

- A puzzle, see Fill-In (puzzle)
- In numerical analysis, the entries of a matrix which change from zero to a non-zero value in the execution of an algorithm; see Sparse matrix § Reducing fill-in
- An issue of a comic book produced by a different creative team than the one regularly assigned to the series, published either to avoid missing a deadline or to give one or more of the series's regular creators a break

== See also ==
- Fill (disambiguation)
- Filling-in
