= WPS-8 =

- Developer: Digital Equipment Corporation
- Initial release: about 1978
- Platform: PDP-8
- Type: Word processor

WPS-8 is a Word Processing System sold by Digital Equipment Corporation for use with their PDP-8 processors (including the VT78, VT278 DECmate, and PC238 DECmate II and PC24P DECmate III microcomputer systems).

WPS-8 supports a variety of 24 row by 80 or 132 column terminals including the VT52 family as well as the VT100 family and all subsequent ANSI-compatible terminals. A series of hierarchical menus allow the user to command the system; the particular style of these menus became very-widely used by Digital, particularly within their "ALL-IN-1" office system. Once a document is opened for editing, near WYSIWYG editing is provided using a ruler to indicate the text alignment and tab stops for any given portion of the text. A typical editing session might look like this:

  Text conformed to the
  preceding ruler (now offscreen).
----L----T-----------------------------T---------------------------------------------R----
    Text conformed to the ruler shown just above
    L -> Left margin
    R -> Ragged-right margin
    T -> Left-aligned tab
---------L----------------------------->---------------------.-----------------------J----
         > -> Right-aligned tab
         . -> Decimal-aligned tab
         J -> Justified right margin (not justified on screen, only on printout)

              Aligned with the right tab
              Decimal-point aligned                        $5.99
                                                         1279.99

Using these various rulers, complex formatting can be achieved, even using a simple input device like a 24x80 character terminal. On ANSI terminals, character attributes such as bold and underline are shown on the screen. On the VT52 terminals (which can not display attributes), the operator can perform the same functions but only the printout will reveal the formatting.

As text is typed, the system automatically word-wraps the text so that it conforms to the ruler currently in effect for that section of the document. Rulers can be added or modified and the text from that ruler forward to the next will automatically be adjusted to conform to the new ruler. Hyphenation can be semi-automatically performed (including "hidden" hyphens that will only be revealed if a line break exposed them).

Specialized editing functions are provided using the terminal keypad. A few functions can be commanded simply by pressing a keypad key, but a far wider range of functions can be commanded by prefixing them with the "Gold Key" (the PF1 key on the keypad, colored gold on systems equipped with the WPS-8 custom keycaps). This style of "gold key" editing also became standard at Digital, later showing up in mainstream general-purpose text editors such as KED and EDT as well as the "ALL-IN-1" office system. The editing facilities include making a selection and then using cut and paste (much like today's word processors, but using keys marked for cut and paste, rather than a mouse).

Printing is to any of several different letter-quality daisy wheel printers including a DEC variant of the Diablo 630.

WPS-8 normally runs from a single floppy diskette and user data can be stored on the system diskette or additional data-only diskettes. Up to four diskette drives are supported in a single system.

The system also supports the creation of data tables, the sorting of these data tables, arithmetic calculations using these data, and a mail-merge operation using these data and the arithmetic results. Through the extensive use of overlays, it manages all that on a 12-bit, 1.2-μs processor with 16 KWords of memory and 256 KB of diskette storage. The limited resources of the system do not permit a spell-checker, though, primarily because there was no place with adequate storage to contain the dictionary file.
