= Fils =

Fils or FILS may refer to:

== People ==
- Anton Fils (1733–1760), German composer
- Arthur Fils (born 2004), French tennis player
- Pascal Fils (born 1984), Canadian football player
- Fils-Aimé, people with this Haitian surname

== Other uses ==
- Fils (currency), a subdivision of currency used in many Arab countries
- Fils (river), in Germany
- Firestone Indy Lights Series, a developmental automobile racing series
- Fast initial link setup, in the IEEE 802.11ai wireless LAN standard

== See also ==
- Fil (disambiguation)
