= Micro-Term ERGO-201 =

Historical computer terminal model

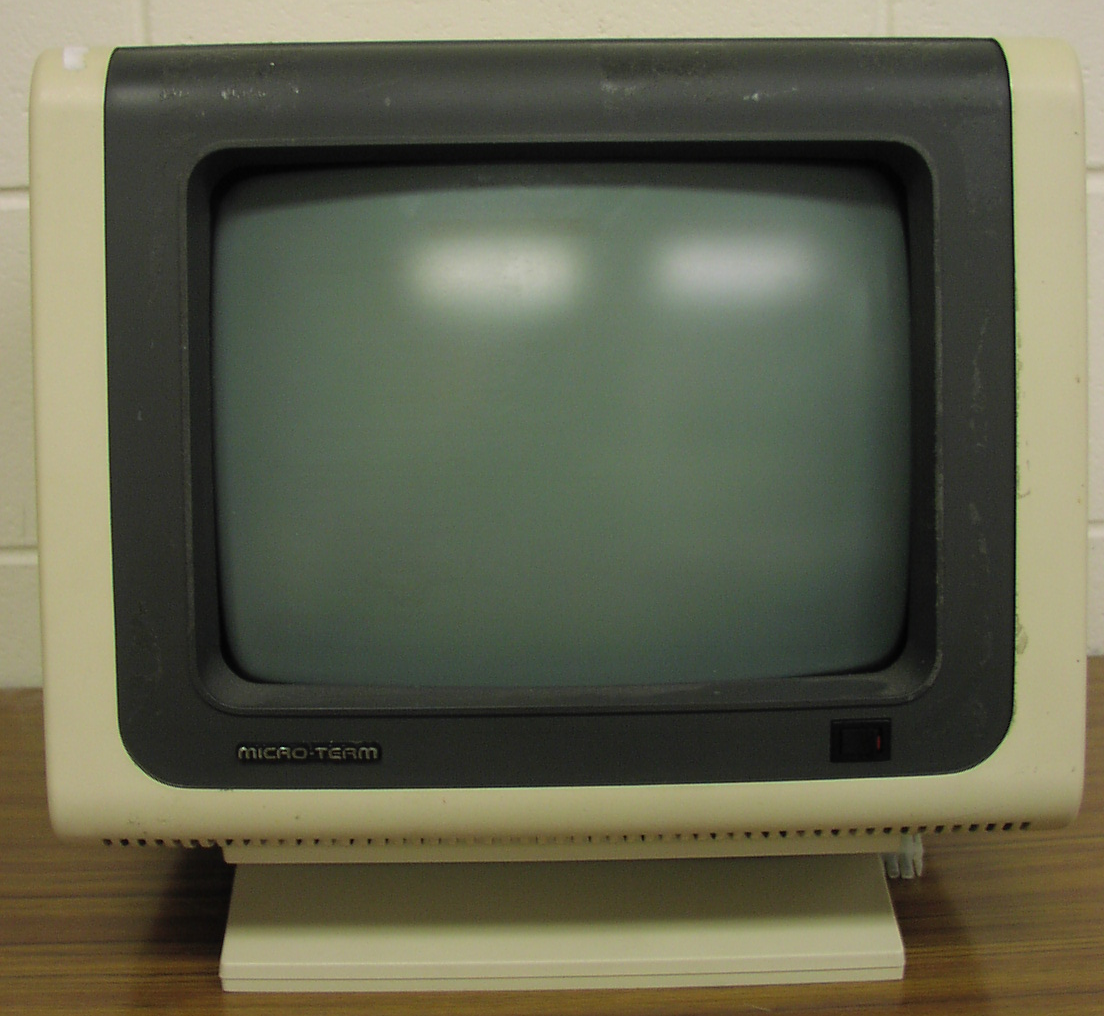
Micro-Term ERGO-201 computer terminal

The Micro-Term ERGO-201 is a computer terminal produced in 1983 as part of the ERGO series of computers manufactured by Micro-Term Incorporated, located in St. Louis, MO. It consists of a monitor and a keyboard. The monitor contains the motherboard with a keyboard, printer, and auxiliary port. The computer runs on a SGS Z8400 CPU, a clone of the Zilog Z80A CPU

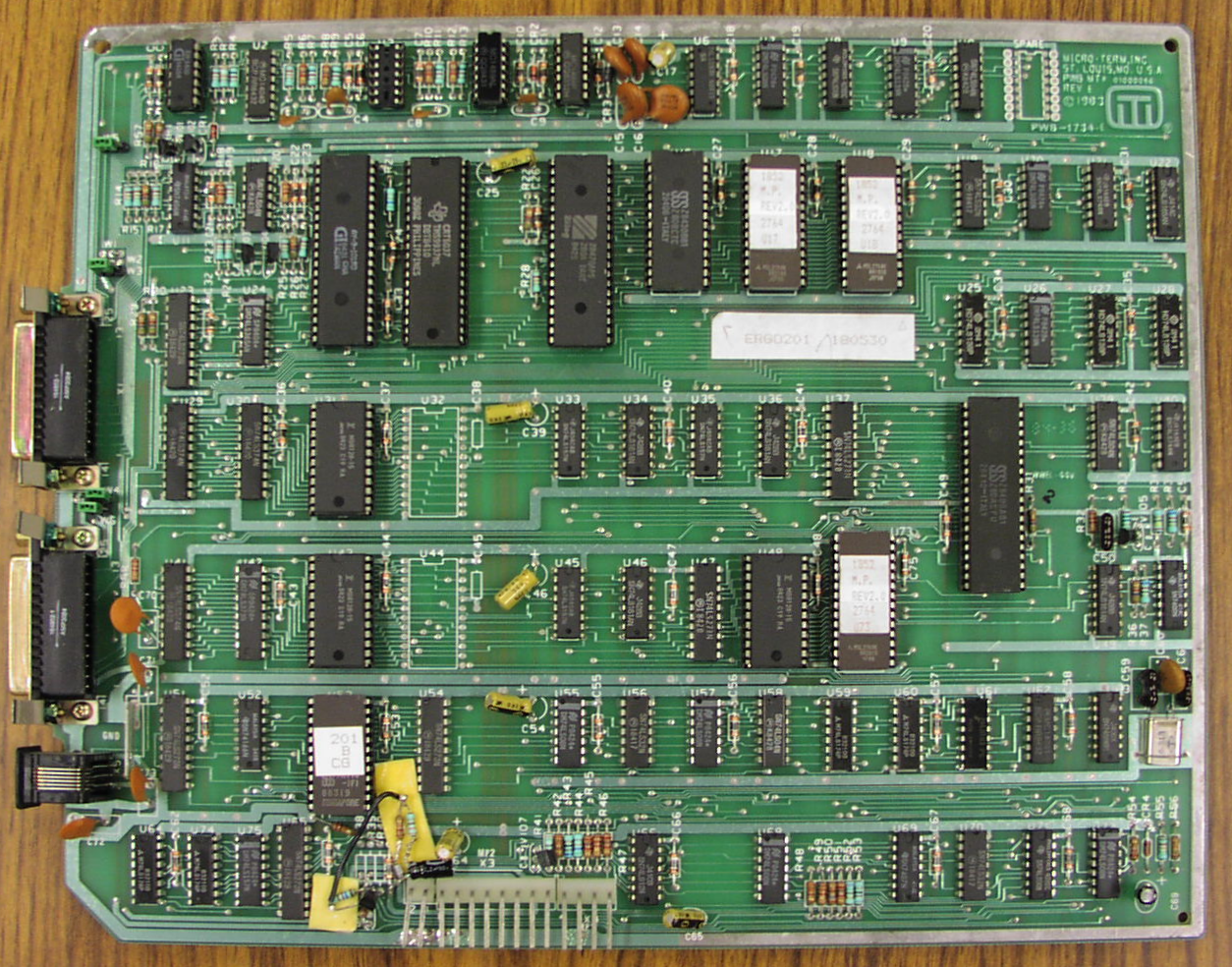
Micro-Term ERGO-201 motherboard

The Micro-Term Ergo Series can emulate a variety of terminals but the most common terminal emulation is VT100.

== See also ==
- Computer terminal
