= Fill =

Fill may refer to:

- Fill dirt, soil added to an area
  - Fill (archaeology), material accumulated in a feature such as a ditch or pit
  - Material used in cut and fill to elevate a surface
- Fill character, added in data transmission to consume time
- Fill device, an electronic module used in cryptography
- Fill (music), a short segment of instrumental music
- Filling yarn, or weft, a component of fabric weaving
- Fill flash, a photography technique
- Fill light, used to reduce the contrast of a photographed, recorded, or staged scene
- Flood fill, or fill pattern, an algorithm to add color or texture in computer graphics
- Fill power, a measure of the "fluffiness" of a down product

== People with the surname ==
- Martino Fill (born 1939), Italian alpine skier
- Peter Fill (born 1982), Italian alpine ski racer

== See also ==
- Embankment (transportation)
- Filler (disambiguation)
- Filling (disambiguation)
- Fill-in (disambiguation)
- Fil
