= Janos Delacruz =

Filipino painter

- Born: November 5, 1985 (age 40)
- Occupation: Artist
- Relatives: Father: Fil Delacruz

Janos Delacruz (born November 5, 1985) is a Filipino painter, illustrator, etcher, and printmaker. He is noted for his surreal and dreamlike paintings, illustrations, and prints. His style and unique approach in his artworks, which show intricate details and a variety of colors, capture the viewer's attention.

== Early life ==
Janos Delacruz was from, and currently lives in, Muntinlupa, Philippines. He is the son of Fil Delacruz, a National Artist Awards nominee for Visual Arts. He finished his college education at the University of Santo Tomas where he majored in Advertising Arts.

== Education ==
2002	San Beda College Alabang, Muntinlupa, Philippines
2006	BFA Major in Advertising Arts, College of Fine Arts and Design University of Santo Tomas, Espana, Metro Manila, Philippines
2012	Art Student League, New York City

== Awards and achievements ==
1998	Jurors' Choice: Letras Y’ Figuras Painting Competition & Exhibition.
2004	First place, Open Fine Prints Competition, Philippine Association of Printmakers
2004	Best Entry, Annual Art Competition (Printmaking Category), Art Association of the Philippines
2005	Second place 38th Shell National Student Art Competition (Digital Art Category)
2006	UST Benavides Outstanding Achievement Awardee Outstanding Thesis in Advertising Arts (Book Illustration) UST College of Fine Arts and Design
2008	Secretary, Philippine Association of Printmakers
2012	Honorable Mention, (Painting Category), AAP Annual Art Competition Finalist, Maningning Miclat Art Foundation Art Competition

== Exhibitions ==
=== One-man exhibitions ===
2002	Olympus: House of God (Pen & Ink) Madrigal Art Center, Commerce Ave. Ayala Alabang, Muntinlupa
2006	Tales From The Big City (Intaglio Prints) The Crucible Gallery, SM Megamall, Mandaluyong
2007	"Visual Journey : A road less traveled…” Artists' Gallery, BF Homes, Paranaque City “ryt;mo sa 2b;g", Two Man Art Exhibition, Sining Makiling Gallery, UP Los Banos
2012	"MAG-AMA", Two Man Art Exhibition The Crucible Gallery, SM Megamall, Mandaluyong “Human / Nature", Two Man Art Exhibition Philippine Center, New York City[2]

=== Group exhibitions ===
1998	Letras Y' Figuras Competition and Exhibition Philamlife Building, U.N. Avenue, Manila City, Philippines
2004	PAP Open Fine Prints Competition & Exhibition Art Walk, SM Megamall, Mandaluyong, Philippines
2004	Annual Art Competition & Exhibition, GSIS Building, Pasay, Philippines
2005	38th Shell National Art Competition & Exhibition, SM Megamall, Mandaluyong, Philippines
2006	Restrike 3 : Philippine Association of Printmakers The Art Center, SM Megamall, Mandaluyong, Philippines
2007	KAIBA / KAISA, 32nd Annual Lakansining Art Exhibition, GSIS Museo ng Sining Pinoyprintmakers@thegermanclubmanila, The German Club, Makati City, Philippines Philippine Print Exhibition, Momentous Art, Singapore KUTKOT: A Cut Above the rest, The Yellow Door Gallery Powerplant Mall Hagonoy Art Group, Hag Art Exhibition Art Circle Gallery, Shangrila Mall, Mandaluyong, Philippines
2008	Monotype Artasia, SM Megamall, Mandaluyong, Philippines
2011	"International Tsai – Mo Art Festival", Taichung, Taiwan Petit Format: PAP Fine Print Exhibition 2011, CCP, Pasay, Philippines
2012	"Art Takes Times Square", New York City “International Tsai – Mo Mask Art Festival", Taichung, Taiwan
2013	27th Asian International Art Exhibition, Bangkok City, Thailand

== See also ==
- Fil Delacruz
