= John Churin =

John Churin is Chief Technology Officer for Tolven. He is well known in the industry as the original developer and architect for the ALL-IN-1 office-automation product suite in 1977 while working for Digital Equipment Corporation .

== Bibliography ==
- Tony Redmond. ALL-IN-1: A Technical Odyssey. Digital Press, Elsevier 1991. ISBN 1-55558-086-6.
- Tony Redmond. ALL-IN-1: For System Managers and Application Developers. Digital Press, Elsevier 1993. ISBN 0-13-027111-X.
- Tony Redmond. ALL-IN-1: Managing and Programming in V3.0. Digital Press, Elsevier 1995. ISBN 1-55558-101-3.
