= Filling =

Filling may refer to:

- A food mixture used for stuffing
- Frosting used between layers of a cake
- Satiety after eating food
- Dental restoration
- Symplectic filling, a kind of cobordism in mathematics
- Part of the leather crusting process

== See also ==
- Fill (disambiguation)
