= DECmate =

Computer series

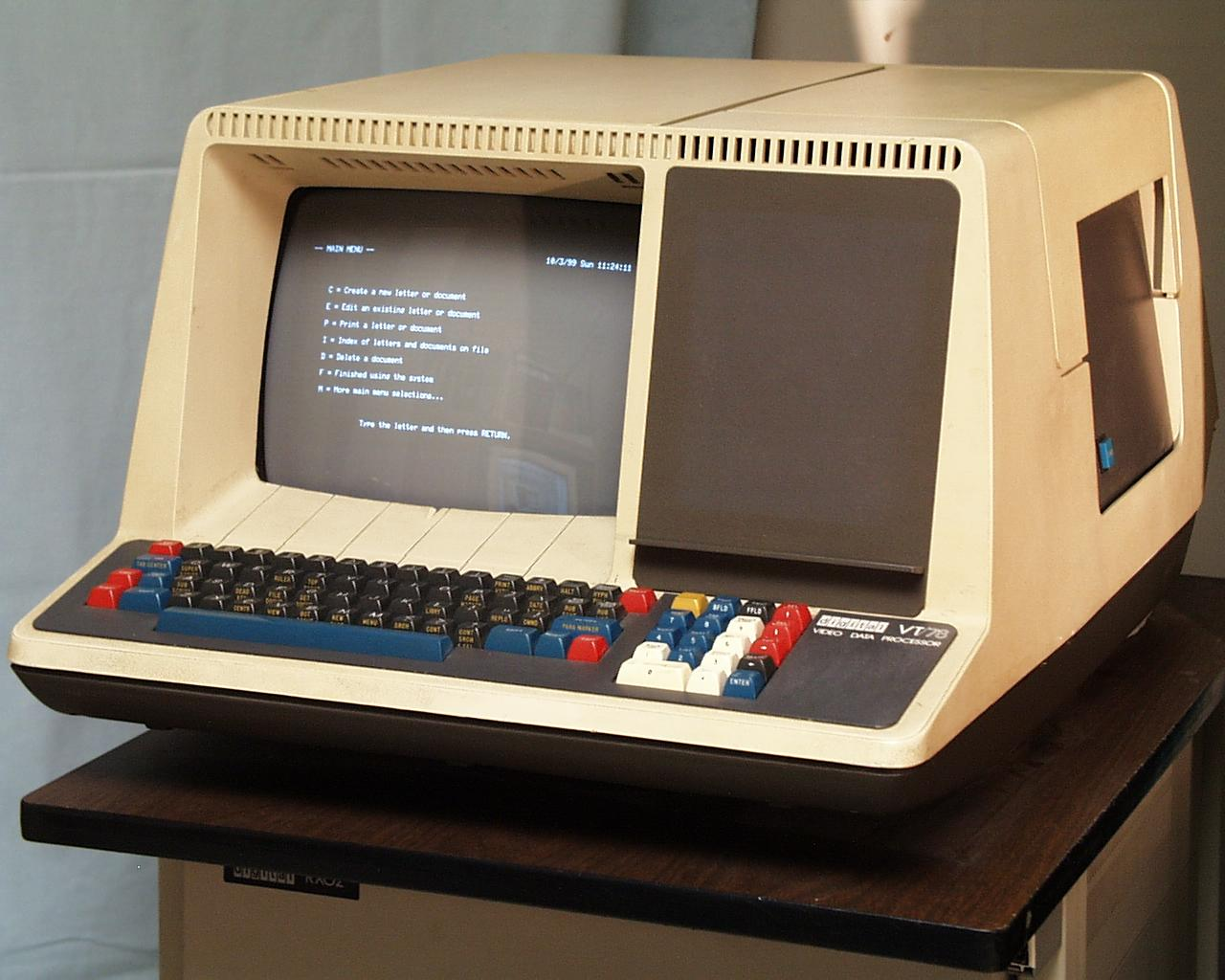
DEC VT78 Video Data Processor: a PDP-8 built into a VT52 body

DECmate was the name of a series of PDP-8-compatible computers produced by the Digital Equipment Corporation in the late 1970s and early 1980s. All of the models used an Intersil 6100 (later known as the Harris 6100) or Harris 6120 (an improved Intersil 6100) microprocessor which emulated the 12-bit DEC PDP-8 CPU. They were text-only and used the OS/78 or OS/278 operating systems, which were extensions of OS/8 for the PDP-8. Aimed at the word processing market, they typically ran the WPS-8 word-processing program. Later models optionally had Intel 8080 or Z80 microprocessors which allowed them to run CP/M. The range was a development of the VT78 which was introduced in July 1977.

== VT78 ==
Introduced in July 1977, this machine was built into a VT52 case and had an Intersil 6100 microprocessor running at 2.2 MHz. The standard configuration included an RX02 dual 8-inch floppy disk unit which was housed in the pedestal that the computer rested on.

== DECmate ==
Introduced in 1980, this machine was built into a VT100 case. It had a 10 MHz clock and 32 Kwords of memory. It was also known as the VT278.

== DECmate II ==
As part of a three-pronged strategy against IBM, the company released this model in 1982 at the same time as the PDP-11-based PRO-350 and the Intel 8088-based Rainbow 100. The DECmate II resembles the Rainbow 100 but uses the 6120 processor. Its two operating systems are the WPS-8 word processing system, and the COS-310 Commercial Operating System running DIBOL. Like the others it had a monochrome VR201 (VT220-style) monitor, an LK201 keyboard and dual 400 KB single-sided quad-density 5.25-inch RX50 floppy disk drives. It had 32 Kwords of RAM for use by programs, and a further 32 Kwords containing code which was used for device emulation. Code running in this second bank was nicknamed "slushware", in contrast to firmware since it was loaded from floppy disk as the machine booted. It was also known as the PC278.

The model could be expanded, either by adding another pair of 5.25-inch floppy disk drives, and it could also support either an additional pair of RX01 or RX02 8-inch floppy disk drives or a Winchester disk. It can also have a coprocessor board added, to allow it to run CP/M. There was a choice of three coprocessor boards, one with a Z80 and 64 KB RAM, and a choice of two boards with both a Z80 and an Intel 8086, the difference being that they had either 256 KB or 512 KB RAM. Manufacture ceased in 1986. It was superseded by the DECmate III, introduced in 1984.

== DECmate III ==
This was introduced in 1984. It had a smaller system case, color monitor, 8 MHz clock, two 5.25-inch RX50 floppy disk drives, 32 KB user RAM, 32 KB system RAM. It was also known as the PC238.

== DECmate III+ ==
This was introduced in 1985 and withdrawn in 1990. It included a hard disk controller as part of the basic configuration. Otherwise, it was very similar to the DECmate III. It was also known as the PC24P.

== PDP-8 compatibility ==
The DECmates were acceptable for word-processing, but due to various hardware quirks, were somewhat incompatible with many existing PDP-8 programs, largely eliminating one potential advantage of the DECmate series over the IBM PC systems. The I/O interfaces worked slightly differently, which meant that most existing user and system programs could not detect Control-C and exit reliably. Every program, both user and system, had to be patched to fix this anomaly. Additionally, the CPU and screen update speeds were noticeably slower than the older PDP-8 systems.
