= Uniface (company) =

Uniface B.V.
- Industry: Software Development
- Founded: 1984 in Amsterdam, Netherlands
- Headquarters: Amsterdam, Netherlands
- Key people: Robert Kruyt (CFO); Roel Stoepker (CTO); Deniz Yugnuk (VP Sales)
- Website: Uniface Official Website

Uniface, a Rocket Software company, is a software development company, located in Amsterdam, Netherlands. It develops the Uniface programming language. The company has around 70 employees and 1600 customers. Telmex, Kawasaki, Airbus or FedEx are Uniface's customers. Uniface was bought by Compuware on 1994. After 20 years the company has been sold to Marlin Equity Partners. At its peak, the company had offices in Amsterdam, Sydney, Vienna, Brussels, São Paulo, Montreal, Paris, Munich, Dublin, Tokyo, Barcelona, Maidenhead and Detroit.

== Products ==
Uniface is a development tool for companies, an IDE, integrating web, mobile and cloud based on the Uniface programming language. This software is distributed on a server based system that licenses to clients on demand. The last version of the product is Uniface 10. In the past it was possible to develop on Apple and DEC platforms, but now only Windows is supported.

== History ==
The programming language Uniface was called UNIS originally and it was developed in the Netherlands in 1984 by Inside Automation. Two years later, the product was launched to the public as Uniface 3, and the company name was changed to Uniface B.V. In 1994, the company was bought by Compuware Corporation. That same year Uniface Six, the first version that used a GUI, was launched. Uniface's rapid deployment platform kept on evolving and in 2012 Uniface 9.6 was launched. One of the first intelligent development platforms that we now call low code. In 2014 the company was acquired by Martin Equity Partners, and became Uniface B.V. again. In 2016 Uniface 10 was launched. In February 2021 Uniface was acquired by Rocket Software to become part of the Business Line Database & Connectivity. The latest release is Rocket® Uniface 10.4 (Sept 2021).
