= Fils-Aimé =

Fils-Aimé is a Haitian surname. Notable people with the name Fils-Aimé include:

- Alix Didier Fils-Aimé, Haitian businessman and the acting president of Haiti since November 2024
- Bernard Fils-Aimé (1953–2020), Haitian businessman
- Dominique Fils-Aimé (born 1984), Canadian singer
- Reggie Fils-Aimé (born 1961), American businessman
