= VT05 =

1970 free-standing CRT terminal from Digital Equipment Corporation

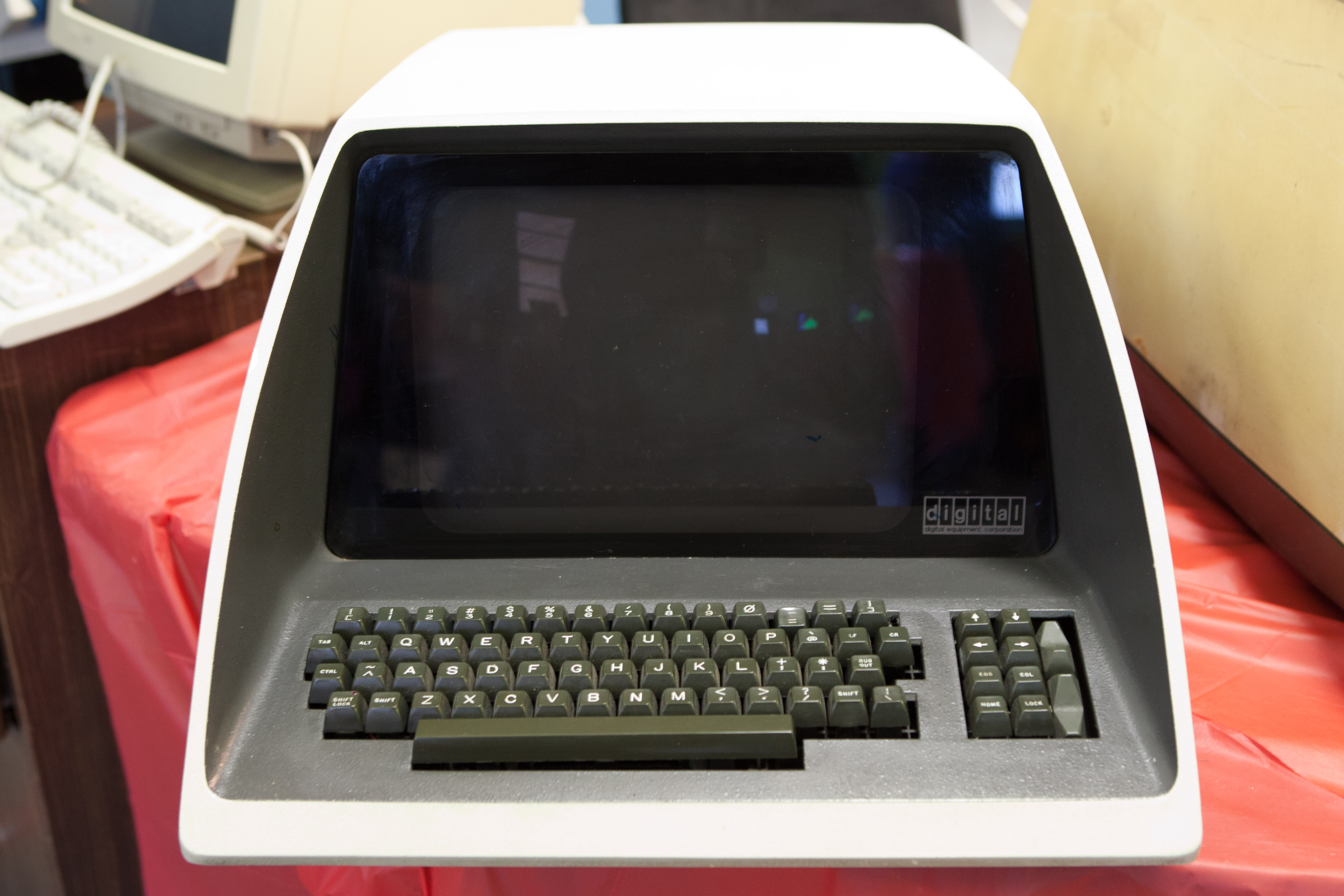
- Developer: Digital Equipment Corporation
- Type: Video terminal
- Released: 1970
- CPU: Discrete logic
- Display: National Semiconductor MM5240
- Successor: VT50

"VT-05" can also refer to Vermont's 5th congressional district.

The VT05 is the first free-standing CRT computer terminal from Digital Equipment Corporation introduced in 1970. Famous for its futuristic styling, the VT05 presents the user with an upper-case-only ASCII character display of 72 columns by 20 rows. The VT05 was a smart terminal that provides cursor addressing using a series of control characters, one of which allows the cursor to be positioned at an absolute location on the screen. This basic system provided the basis of similar systems in the later and greatly improved VT50 and VT52 series.

The terminal only supports forward scrolling and direct cursor addressing; no fancier editing functions are supported. No special character renditions (such as blinking, bolding, underlining, or reverse video) are supported. The VT05 supports asynchronous communication at baud rates up to 2400 bits per second (although fill characters are required above 300 bits per second).

Internally, the VT05 implements four "quad-sized" DEC modules in a standard form-factor DEC backplane. The cards are mounted nearly horizontally over an off-the-shelf CRT monitor. The terminal is 19" wide and 30" deep (much deeper than a typical desk).

The keyboard used advanced capacitive sensors, but this proved to be unreliable and later keyboards use a simple four-contact mechanical switch.

The VT05's dynamic storage is a PMOS shift register; the delays associated with manipulating data in the shift register result in the VT05 requiring fill characters after each line feed (as compared to contemporaneous hard copy terminals which require fill characters after each carriage return).

The VT05 also has the capability of acting as a black-and-white RS-170-standard video monitor for videotape recorders, cameras, and other sources. The VT05 is equipped with a video input, and can superimpose its text over the displayed video, making it suitable for interactive video systems.

The VT05 was eventually superseded by the VT50 which itself was quickly superseded by the VT52.

== Commands ==
The VT05 has a limited command set:

Decimal	Control Char	ASCII	VT05 name	Function
7	^G	BEL	BELL	Produce an audible tone on an electronic speaker, for 266 ms at 780 Hz (G_{5}).
8	^H	BS	C←	Move cursor left one space.
9	^I	HT	TAB	Horizontal tab. Move cursor forward to next tab stop. Stops are fixed at every eight characters.
10	^J	LF	LF	Line feed. Move cursor down one line. If in last line, scroll screen contents up one line instead.
11	^K	VT	C↓	Move cursor down one line.
13	^M	CR	CR	Carriage return (move cursor to leftmost column of the current line)
14	^N	SO	CAD	Direct cursor addressing. Move cursor to line and column specified by the two characters that follow, 31+Y then 31+X (top line and leftmost columns are numbered one.)
24	^X	CAN	C→	Move cursor right one space.
26	^Z	SUB	C↑	Move cursor up one line.
29	^]	GS	HOME	Move cursor to top line, leftmost column.
30	^^	RS	EOL	Erase to end of line (including character at the cursor). Cursor remains at current location.
31	^_	US	EOS	Erase to end of screen (i.e., erase chars at or after cursor on current line and all chars on lines below current line). Cursor remains at current location.

The screen can be cleared by sending HOME and then EOS.
