= Fill-In (puzzle) =

Crossword-like puzzle

An unsolved Fill-In (left) and a solved one (right)

Fill-Ins, also known as Fill-It-Ins or Word Fill-Ins, are a variation of the common crossword puzzle in which words, rather than clues, are given, and the solver must work out where to place them. Fill-Ins are common in puzzle magazines along with word searches, cryptograms, and other logic puzzles. Some people consider Fill-Ins to be an easier version of the crossword. Since the Fill-In requires no outside knowledge of specific subjects, one can solve the puzzle in another language.

Solving a Fill-In usually requires trial-and-error. A first word is often given to help the solver start, but some difficult puzzles require the solver to begin from scratch without any help. Word entries are listed alphabetically by the number of letters.

== Rules ==
The solver is given a grid and a list of words. To solve the puzzle correctly, the solver must find a solution that fits all of the available words into the grid. Generally, these words are listed by number of letters, and further alphabetically. Many times, one word is filled in for the solver to help them begin the game.

== Solution methods ==
Solving a Fill-In typically amounts to searching for words of a certain length with letters in specific places. If a starter word is given in the grid, using it as the beginning search point is often useful. Raw "trial and error" is best used when only two or three words can potentially fit at a given location; temporarily assume one of the words, and see if an impossible letter combination results. If so, that word is not the one that should go in the grid at that location. Smaller words may be easier to fit in the grid, but longer words give more clues to connecting words.

Care must be given to marking out words that are not explicitly placed in the grid; this occurs when one fills in a vertical sequence of horizontal words, or vice versa. Forgetting to do this results in "extra words" and often makes the puzzle more difficult to solve.

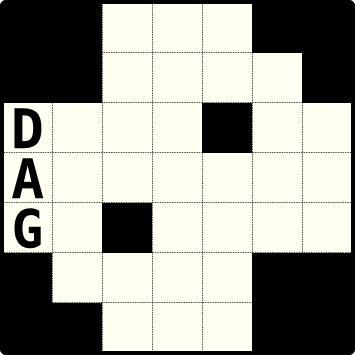
Starting grid for a simple Fill-In. The word list is:
GI IO ON OR
DAG EVO OED REF
ARID CLEF CLOD DAIS DENS DOLE EDIT SILO
ARTICLE VESICLE

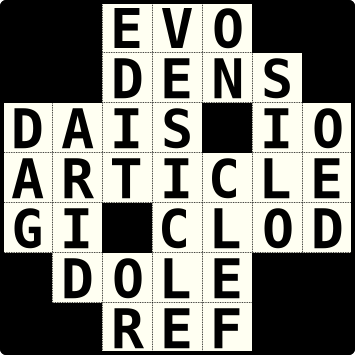
Solved Fill-In

== Variations ==
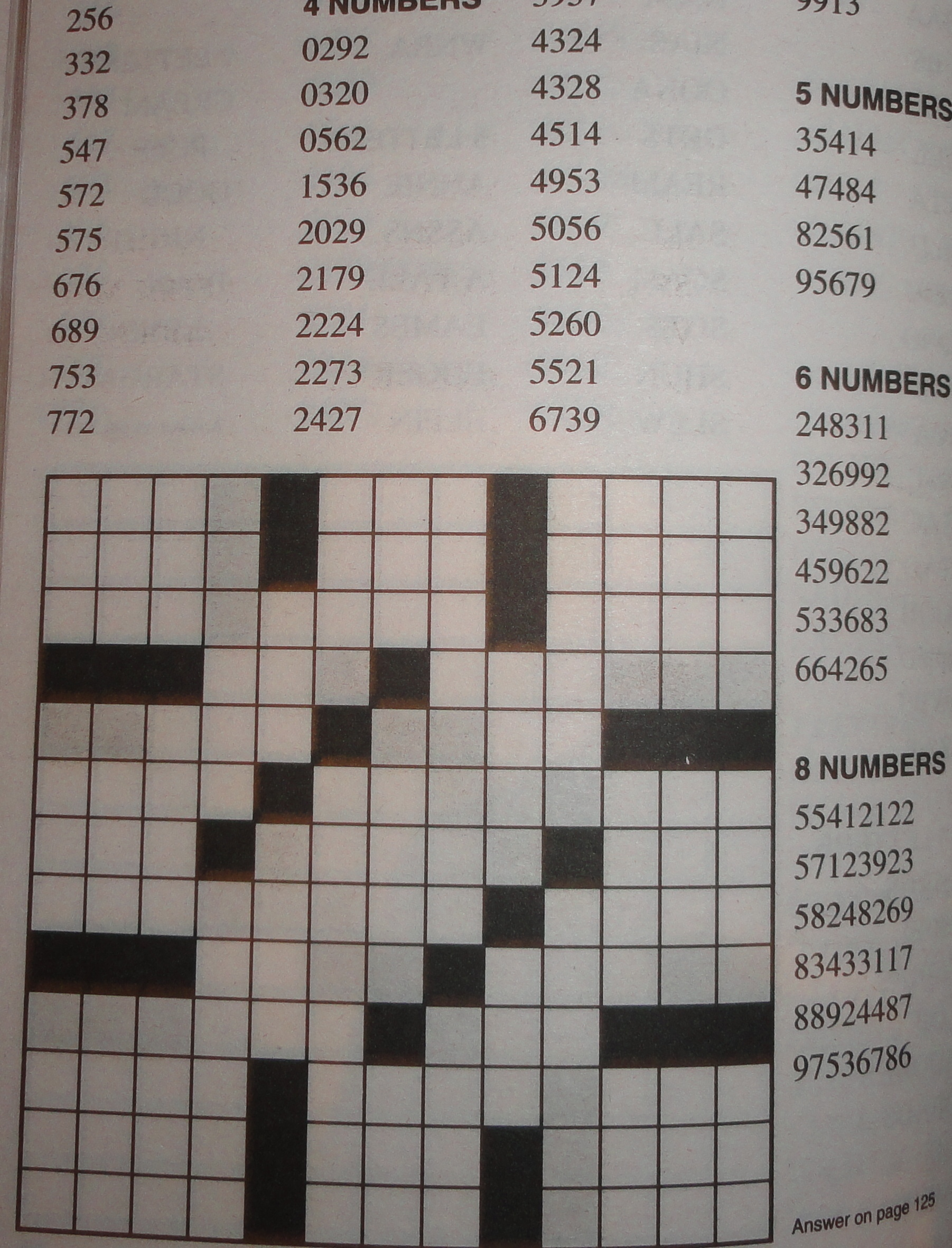
A "cross number" Fill-In

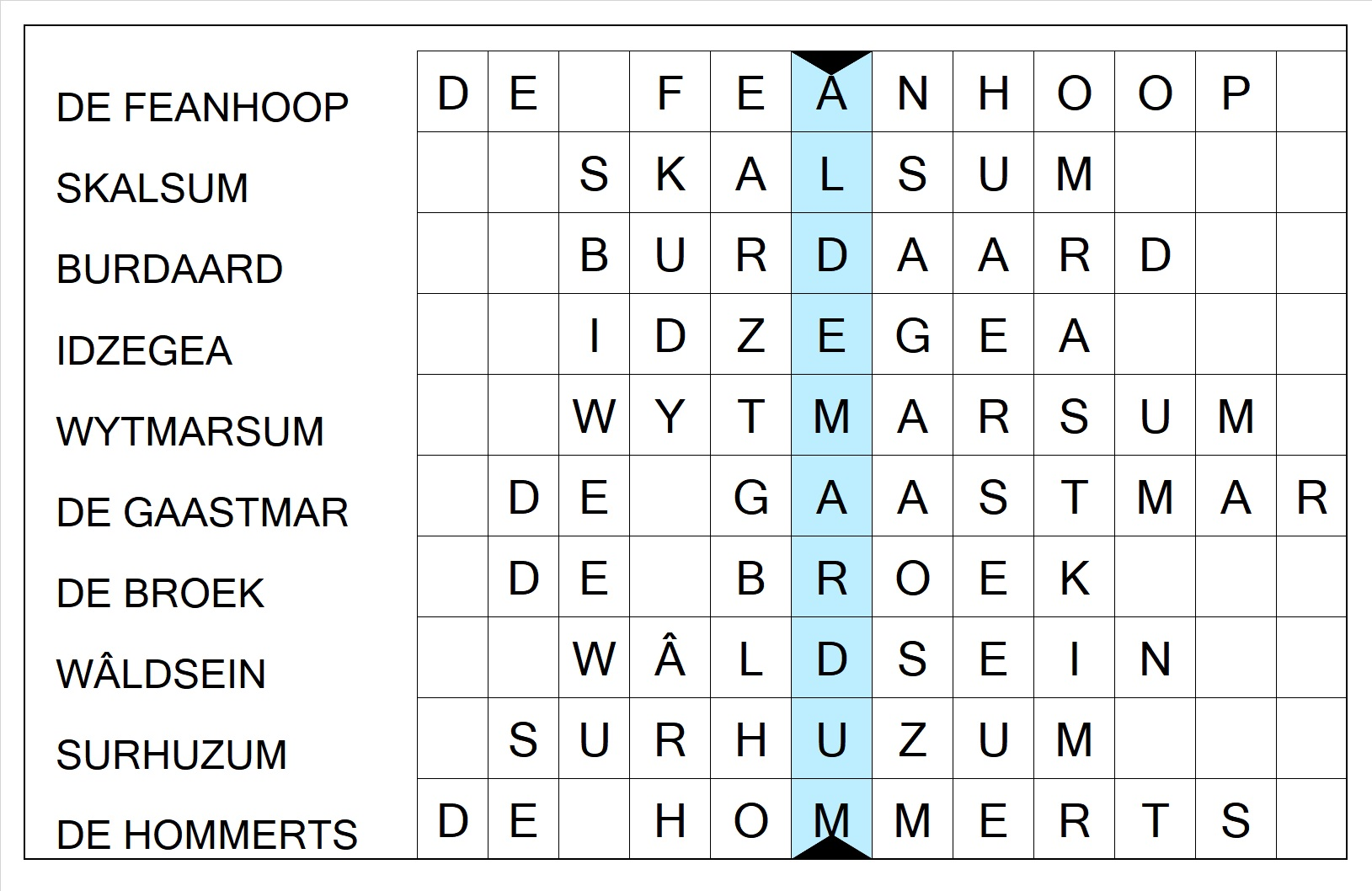
Another Fill-in variation

A common variation on the standard Fill-In is using numbers, instead of specific words, sometimes called "cross numbers". In this puzzle, the entries could be listed as the number, a mathematical expression, or even an important year.

A more complex variation on the Fill-In is the "diagramless" Fill-In, where the grid is initially empty. Another variation is having no words listed at all, but gathering them from a known group of words, such as the fifty American states.
