= Zbigniew Fil =

Polish singer (born 1977)

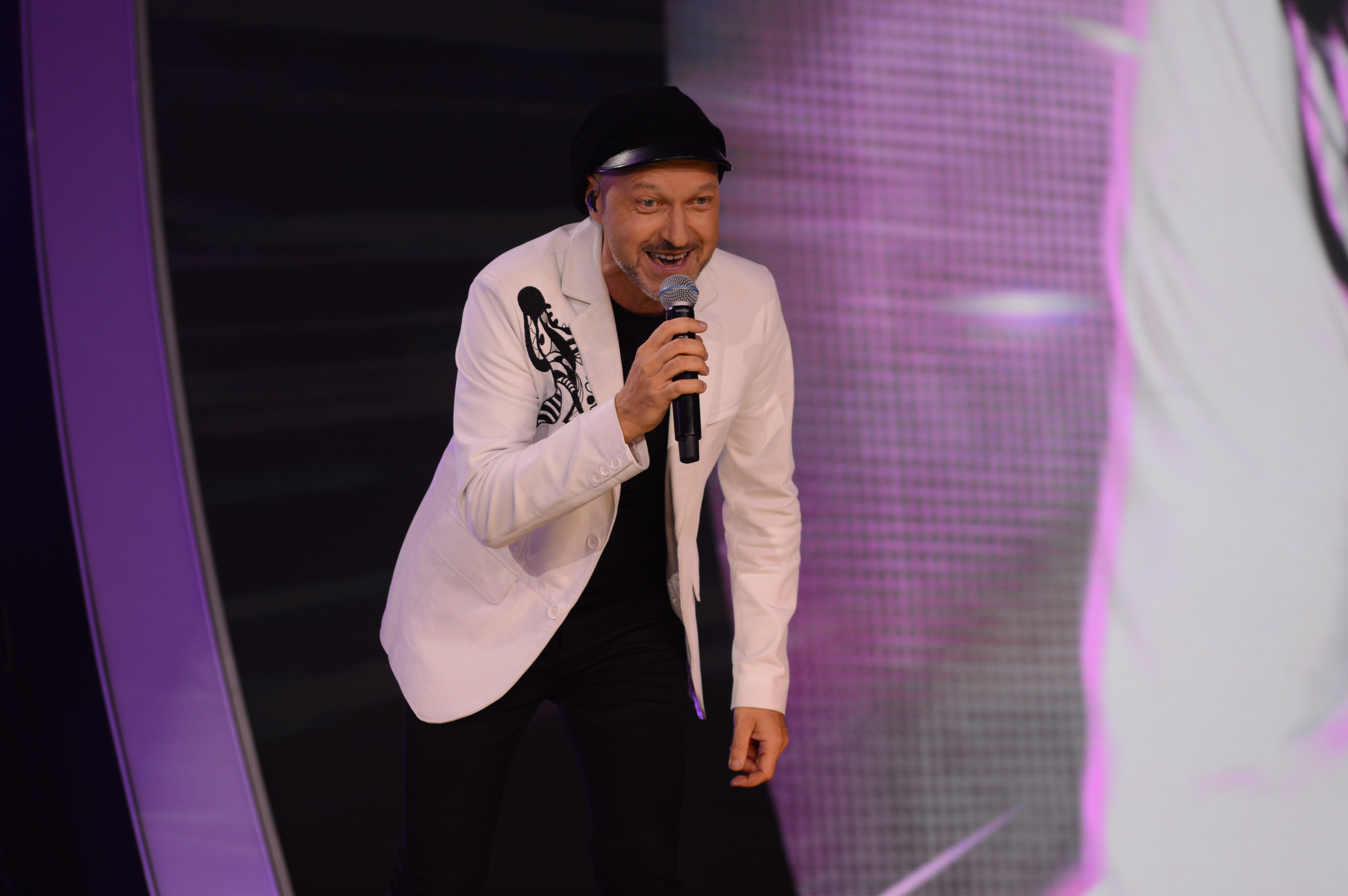
Zbigniew Fil (2022)

Zbigniew Fil (born 17 March 1977, in Zamość) is a Polish singer and multi-instrumentalist.

He studied viola at the Academy of Music in Kraków and won the TVN program Droga do gwiazd.

== Discography ==
- 1997 Nic nie boli, tak jak życie (Budka Suflera)
- 2005 Definition of Bass (Wojciech Pilichowski)
- 2009 Zaczarowane Miasto (Łosowski)
