= Fil Delacruz =

Filipino artist (born 1950)

Filimon "Fil" Delacruz
- Born: November 22, 1950; Sta. Cruz, Hangonoy, Bulacan
- Occupations: Painter, printmaker
- Relatives: Jan Olympus "Janos" Delacruz

Filimon "Fil" Delacruz (born 1950) is a National artist nominee, visual artist and a master printmaker who specializes in mezzotint prints, a printmaking process used to achieve producing half tones without the use of line or dot based techniques such as hatching, stippling and pointillism. His works is known for being rich in ethnic imageries and indigenous symbols. He is a former president of the Philippine Association of the Printmakers and a former senior lecturer of college of fine arts in University of the Philippines Diliman.

== Early life and education ==
Delacruz was born on November 22, 1950, in Hagonoy, Bulacan. He is the father of Janos Delacruz, an award-winning printmaker. He studied in University of Santo Tomas College of Architecture and Fine Arts and pursued Advertising major. He went to New York to be part of Art Students' League in 1983 and in 1992, he attended a lithography workshop in Paris, France to study printmaking techniques and at the same time, he was named by the Cultural Center of the Philippines (CCP) as one of the Thirteen Artist Awardees, a triennial and prestigious award granted by the Cultural Center of the Philippines. During his early years, he is fond of participating national competitions, which he wins consistently especially in the annual art competition by the Art Association of the Philippines (AAP). He is an awardee of Benavidez Award for Outstanding Achievement.

== Career history ==
From 1992 to 1995, Delacruz worked as a senior lecturer at the University of the Philippines College of Fine Arts in Diliman, Quezon City. After years of teaching, he was appointed as the president of the Philippine Association of Printmakers in 1995. He is also a president of Lakansining ng Bulakan. His works has been exhibited in France, New York, New Jersey, Czechoslovakia, Germany, China, Hong Kong, Korea, Spain, Belgium, and in the Philippines. He is currently residing in his studio named "Bahay Sining", which is located in Muntinlupa together with his son, Janos. Delacruz is holding art workshops in the Artist Gallery BF located in Paranaque.

== Awards, distinctions and achievements ==
Award	Year	Competition
First prize	1971	YMCA 19th Annual Students Art Competition of the Philippines
First honorable mention	1972	1st AFA Group Sculpture Contest, UST
Second honorable mention	1972	2nd Annual on-the-Spot Painting Contest, Public Recreation Bureau
First honorable mention	1973	Photography Contest, UST Annual Students’ Art Competition
First prize	1973	Graphic Arts Competition, UST Annual Students’ Art Competition
Benavidez Awardee	1973	University of Santo Tomas College of Architecture and Fine Arts
Honorable mention	1974	Rotary Club, On-the-Spot Watercolor Painting Contest
Grand prize	1975	Bancom Graphic Arts Competition
Gold medal	1980	34th Annual Art Competition, Art Association of the Philippines
Grand prize	1982	35th Annual Art Competition, Art Association of the Philippines
Finalist	1982	First International Biennial for Print, Republic of China
Grand prize	1983	36th Annual Art Competition, Art Association of the Philippines
	1985	Outstanding Bulakeño in the Field of Arts
Honorable mention	1986	Art Association of the Philippines, Rotary Open Art Competition, Graphic Art Experimental Category
Second prize	1986	Art Association of the Philippines, Rotary Open Art Competition
Best entry	1989-1980	Light Foundation Art Competition
	1992	Philippine Representative to the Republic of Namibia, Global Print Porfoliio
Thirteen Artists Awardee	1992	Cultural Center of the Philippines
Senior lecturer, College of Fine Arts, University of the Philippines, Diliman, Quezon City	1992-1995	
President, Philippine Association of Printmakers	1995	
First prize	1998	Graphic Arts Category, National Commission for Culture and Arts Third Biennial Arts Competition

== See also ==
- Janos Delacruz
- Printmaking
- Mezzotint
- Art Students League of New York
