= VT180 =

Personal computer produced by Digital Equipment Corporation

DEC VT180
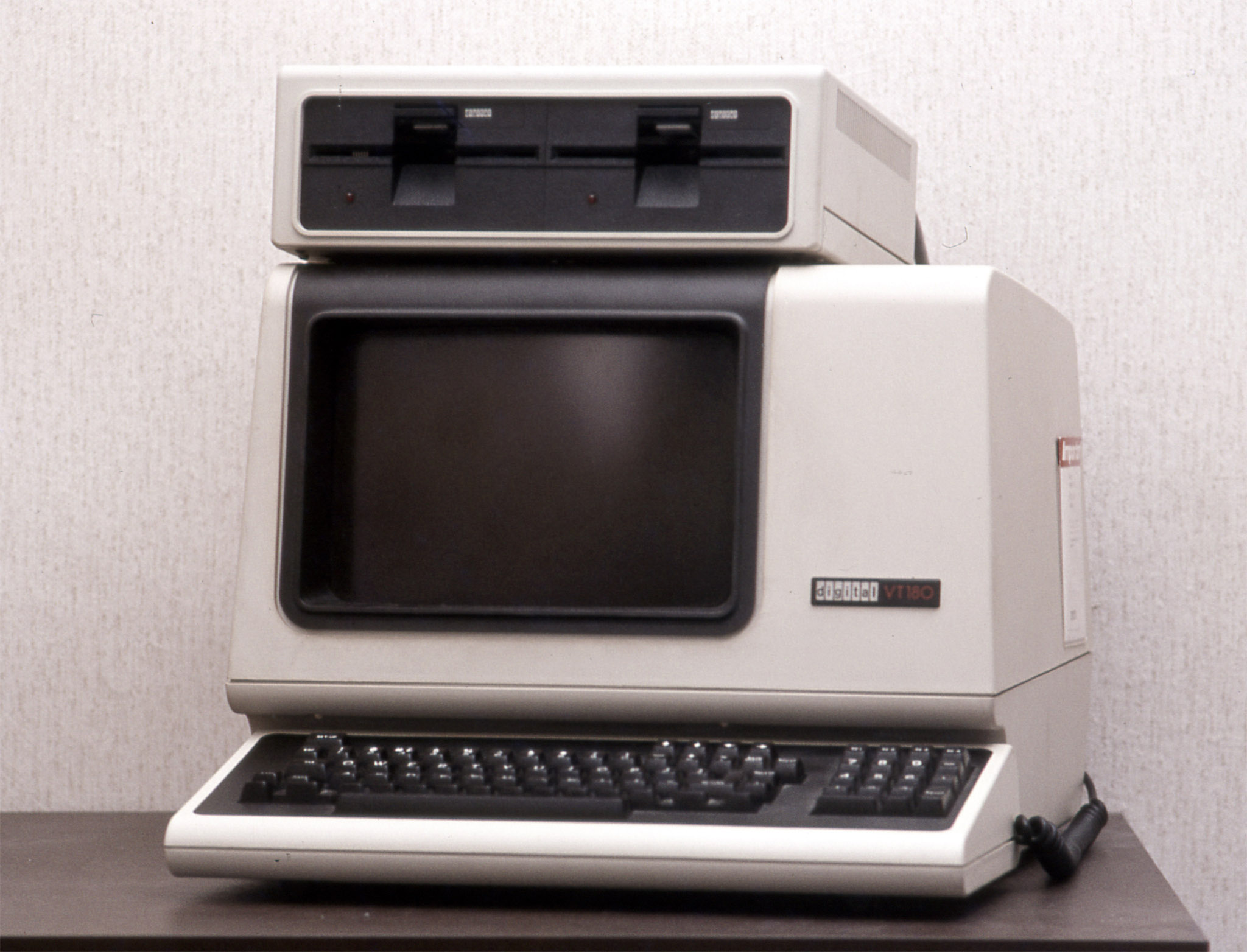
- Manufacturer: DEC
- Type: Personal Computer
- Released: 1982
- Discontinued: 1983
- Operating system: CP/M
- CPU: Z80 @ 2 MHz
- Memory: 64 KB RAM
- Removable storage: 5.25-inch floppy disks
- Display: 12 in (30 cm) CRT; 80x24 characters
- Successor: Rainbow 100

The VT180 is a personal computer produced by Digital Equipment Corporation (DEC) of Maynard, Massachusetts, USA.

Introduced in early 1982, the CP/M-based VT180 was DEC's entry-level microcomputer. "VT180" is the unofficial name for the combination of the VT100 computer terminal and VT18X option. The VT18X includes a 2 MHz Zilog Z80 microprocessor and 64K RAM on two circuit boards that fit inside the terminal, and two external 5.25-inch floppy disk drives with room for two more in an external enclosure. The VT180 was codenamed "Robin".

Digital later released a full-fledged personal computer known as the Rainbow 100 as the successor to Robin.

When Digital ended the VT100 terminal family in 1983, it also discontinued the VT180. No direct replacement was offered, although the Rainbow 100 eventually provided a superset of Robin's functionality.
