= FIL file =

FIL file may refer to:

- In Audit Command Language (ACL), a Table Data file.
- In Application Generator, a File Template.
- In dBASE Application Generator, a Files List Object file.
- In Mirror (computing), a file containing a saved File Allocation Table (FAT), created by some DOS mirror programs.
- An Overlay (programming) file.
- A Symbian Application Logo File, containing bitmap images used for application icons.
