= ALL-IN-1 =

Office automation product

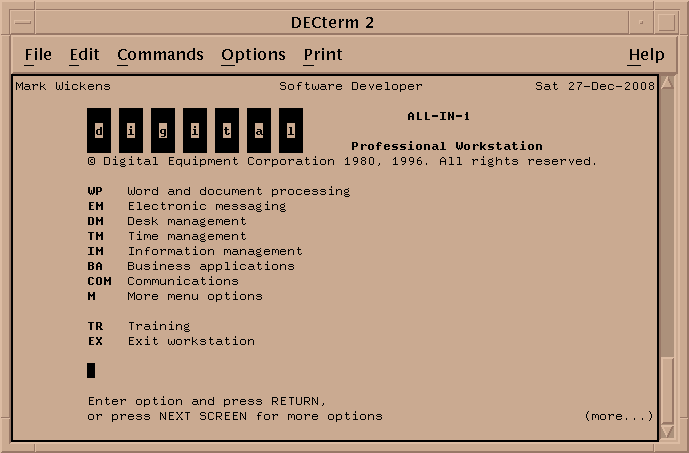
- ALLIN1 Title Page
- Other names: CP/OSS
- Original author(s): Skip Walter, John Churin and Marty Skinner
- Developer(s): Digital Equipment Corporation, Hewlett-Packard
- Stable release: ALL-IN-1 Office Server V3.2
- Operating system: OpenVMS
- Platform: VAX, Alpha
- Available in: English
- Type: Office software

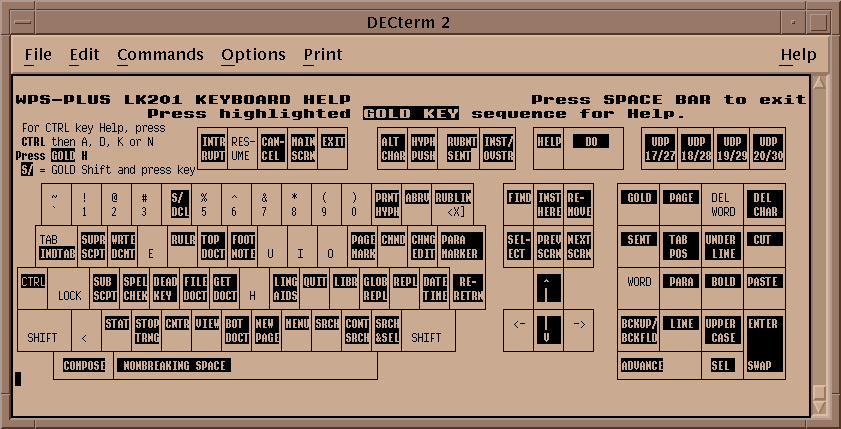
ALLIN1 WPS Plus Help Screen

ALL-IN-1 was an office automation product developed and sold by Digital Equipment Corporation in the 1980s. It was one of the first purchasable off the shelf electronic mail products. It was later known as Office Server V3.2 for OpenVMS Alpha and OpenVMS VAX systems before being discontinued.

== Overview ==
ALL-IN-1 was advertised as an office automation system including functionality in Electronic Messaging, Word Processing and Time Management. It offered an application development platform and customization capabilities that ranged from scripting to code-level integration.

ALL-IN-1 was designed and developed by Skip Walter, John Churin and Marty Skinner from Digital Equipment Corporation who began work in 1977. Sheila Chance was hired as the software engineering manager in 1981. The first version of the software, called CP/OSS, the Charlotte Package of Office System Services, named after the location of the developers, was released in May 1982. In 1983, the product was renamed ALL-IN-1 and the Charlotte group continued to develop versions 1.1 through 1.3.

Digital then made the decision to move most of the development activity to its central engineering facility in Reading, United Kingdom, where a group there took responsibility for the product from version 2.0 (released in field test in 1984 and to customers in 1985) onward. The Charlotte group continued to work on the Time Management subsystem until version 2.3 and other contributions were made from groups based in Sophia Antipolis, France (System for Customization Management and the integration with VAX Notes), Reading (Message Router and MAILbus), and Nashua, New Hampshire (FMS). ALL-IN-1 V3.0 introduced shared file cabinets and the File Cabinet Server (FCS) to lay the foundation for an eventual integration with TeamLinks, Digital's PC office client. Previous integrations with PCs included PC ALL-IN-1, a DOS-based product introduced in 1989 that never proved popular with customers.

Bob Wyman was the first product manager. He oversaw the growth of the product culminating in over $2 billion per year in revenue and market leadership in the proprietary office automation sector.

Other consultants from Digital Equipment Corporation involved include Frank Nicodem, Donald Vickers and Tony Redmond.

== See also ==
- History of email

== Bibliography ==
- Redmond, Tony (1992). ALL-IN-1: A Technical Odyssey. Maynard, Mass.: Digital Press. ISBN 1-55558-086-6.
- Redmond, Tony (1992). ALL-IN-1: For System Managers and Application Developers. Maynard, Mass.: Digital Press. ISBN 0-13-027111-X.
- Redmond, Tony (1993). ALL-IN-1: Managing and Programming in V3.0. Burlington, Mass.: Digital Press. ISBN 1-55558-101-3.
- Redmond, Tony (1995). Working with TeamLinks: using Digital's office client for Microsoft Windows. Boston: Digital Press. ISBN 1-55558-140-4.
- Rhoton, John. ALL-IN-1: Integrating Applications in V3.0. Butterworth-Heinemann Ltd. ISBN 1-55558-102-1.
