= VT100 =

Computer terminal from Digital Equipment Corporation

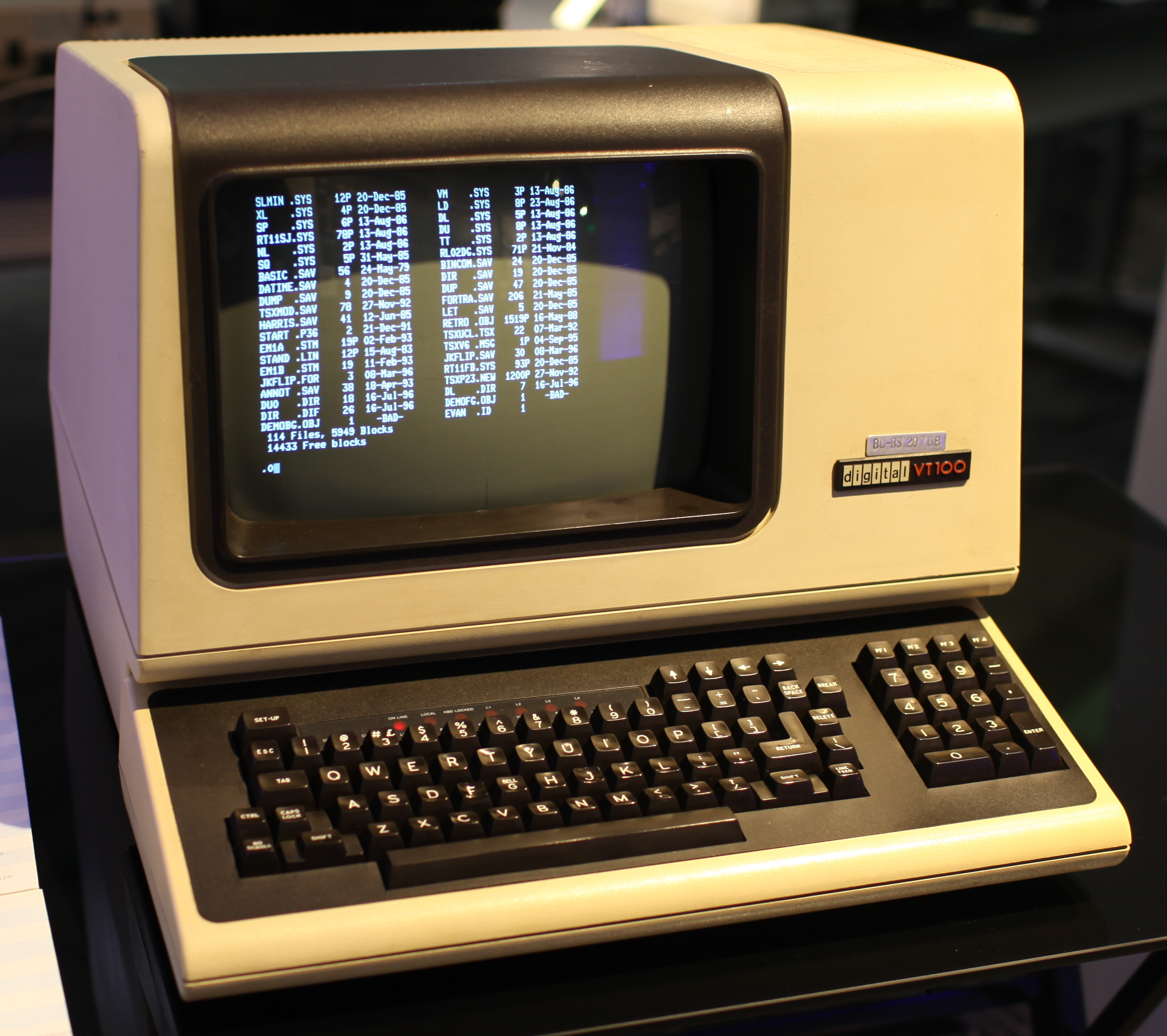
- Manufacturer: DEC
- Type: Computer terminal
- Released: 1978
- CPU: Intel 8080
- Memory: 3 KB RAM; 8 KB ROM; 175 byte NVRAM
- Display: 12 in (30 cm) CRT; 80×24 or 132×14 characters
- Sound: Speaker (in keyboard)
- Input: 83-key detachable keyboard
- Connectivity: RS-232 serial (optional) 20 mA current loop
- Weight: Monitor: 30 lb (14 kg); Keyboard: 4.5 lb (2.0 kg)
- Predecessor: VT50
- Successor: VT220

The VT100 is a video terminal, introduced in August 1978 by Digital Equipment Corporation (DEC). It was one of the first terminals to support ANSI escape codes for cursor control and other tasks, and added a number of extended codes for special features like controlling the status lights on the keyboard. This led to rapid uptake of the ANSI standard, which became the de facto standard for hardware video terminals and later terminal emulators.

The VT100 series, especially the VT102, was extremely successful in the market, and made DEC the leading terminal vendor at the time. The VT100 series was replaced by the VT200 series starting in 1983, which proved equally successful. Ultimately, over six million terminals in the VT series were sold, based largely on the success of the VT100.

== Description ==
DEC's first video terminal was the VT05 (1970), succeeded by the VT50 (1974), and soon upgraded to the VT52 (1975). The VT52 featured a text display with 80 columns and 24 rows, bidirectional scrolling, and a custom control protocol that allowed the cursor to be moved about the screen. These "smart terminals" were a hit due both to their capabilities and to their ability to be run over inexpensive serial links, rather than custom proprietary connections as in the case of systems like the IBM 3270, which generally required expensive controllers for distributed applications. In contrast, "dumb terminals" or "glass teletypes" like the ADM-3 (1975) lacked advanced features such as full cursor addressability, and competed mostly on lowest possible hardware cost.

The VT100 was introduced in August 1978, replacing the VT50/VT52 family. Like the earlier models, it communicated with its host system over serial lines at a minimum speed of 50 bit/s, but increased the maximum speed to 19,200 bit/s, double that of the VT52. The terminal provided an option for "smooth scrolling", whereby displayed lines of text were moved gradually up or down the screen to make room for new lines, instead of advancing in sudden "jumps". This made it easier to scan or read the text, although it somewhat slowed down the maximum data rate.

The major internal change was the control protocol. Unlike the VT50/52's proprietary cursor control language, the VT100 was based on the newly emerging ANSI X3.64 standard for command codes. (Note: A similar standard was being organized as ECMA-48, which was fairly similar to X3.64. The two standards were later merged in ISO 6429.) At the time, some computer vendors had suggested that the new standard was beyond the state of the art and could not be implemented at a reasonable price. The introduction of low-cost microprocessors and the ever-falling cost of computer memory offered greatly expanded capabilities, and the VT100 used the new Intel 8080 as its internal processor. In addition, the VT100 provided backwards compatibility for VT52-compatible software, by also supporting the older control sequences. Other improvements beyond the VT52 included a 132-column mode, and a variety of "graphic renditions" including blinking, bolding, reverse video, underlining, and lines of double-sized or double-width characters. The VT100 also introduced an additional box-drawing character set containing various pseudographics that allowed the drawing of on-screen forms.

All configuration setup of the VT100 was accomplished using interactive displays presented on the screen; the setup data was stored in non-volatile memory within the terminal. Maintainability was also significantly improved, since a VT100 could be quickly dismantled into replaceable modules.

The VT100's internal layout can be split into two boards for functionality, not including the VT100's optional boards you can purchase. There is a board called the video monitor board which is used for things like adjusting the CRT on the terminal itself. This board is responsible for adjusting the CRT in the case that the electron beam is offset. The terminal controller board is what handles the terminal logic, and includes a multitude of chips such as DEC's rebranding of the Intel 8080.

In 1983, the VT100 was replaced by the more powerful VT200 series terminals such as the VT220.

== Options ==
The VT100 has various third party and first party boards designed to enhance the capabilities of the device. Most notable of these from DEC themselves are the VT1XX-AB (Advanced Video Option) and the VT1XX-AA (20 mA Current Loop Option). The cards' capabilities and existence are described in Chapter 4 of the VT100 User Guide.

== Variants ==
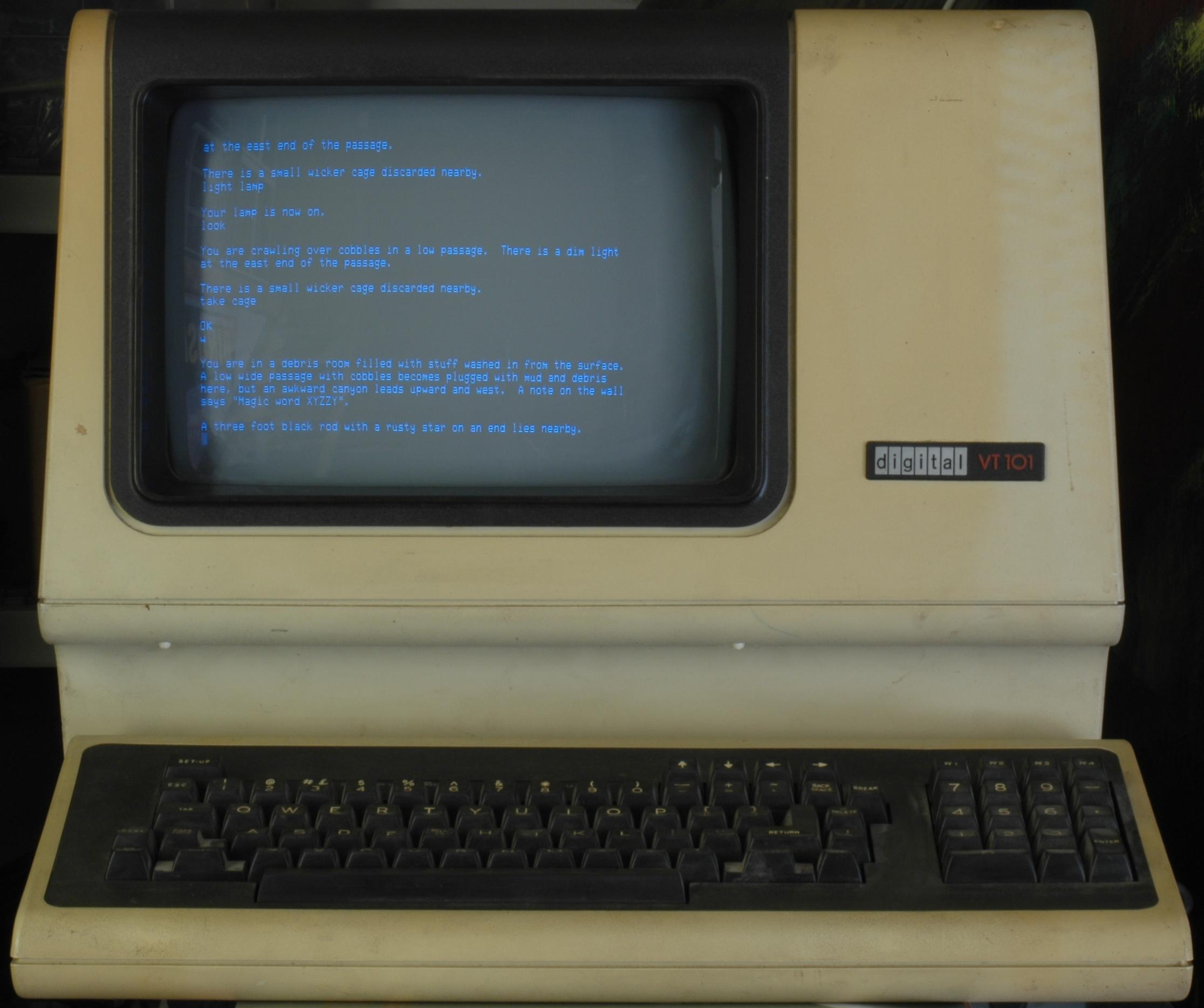
The VT101 was the lowest-cost member of the VT100 family.

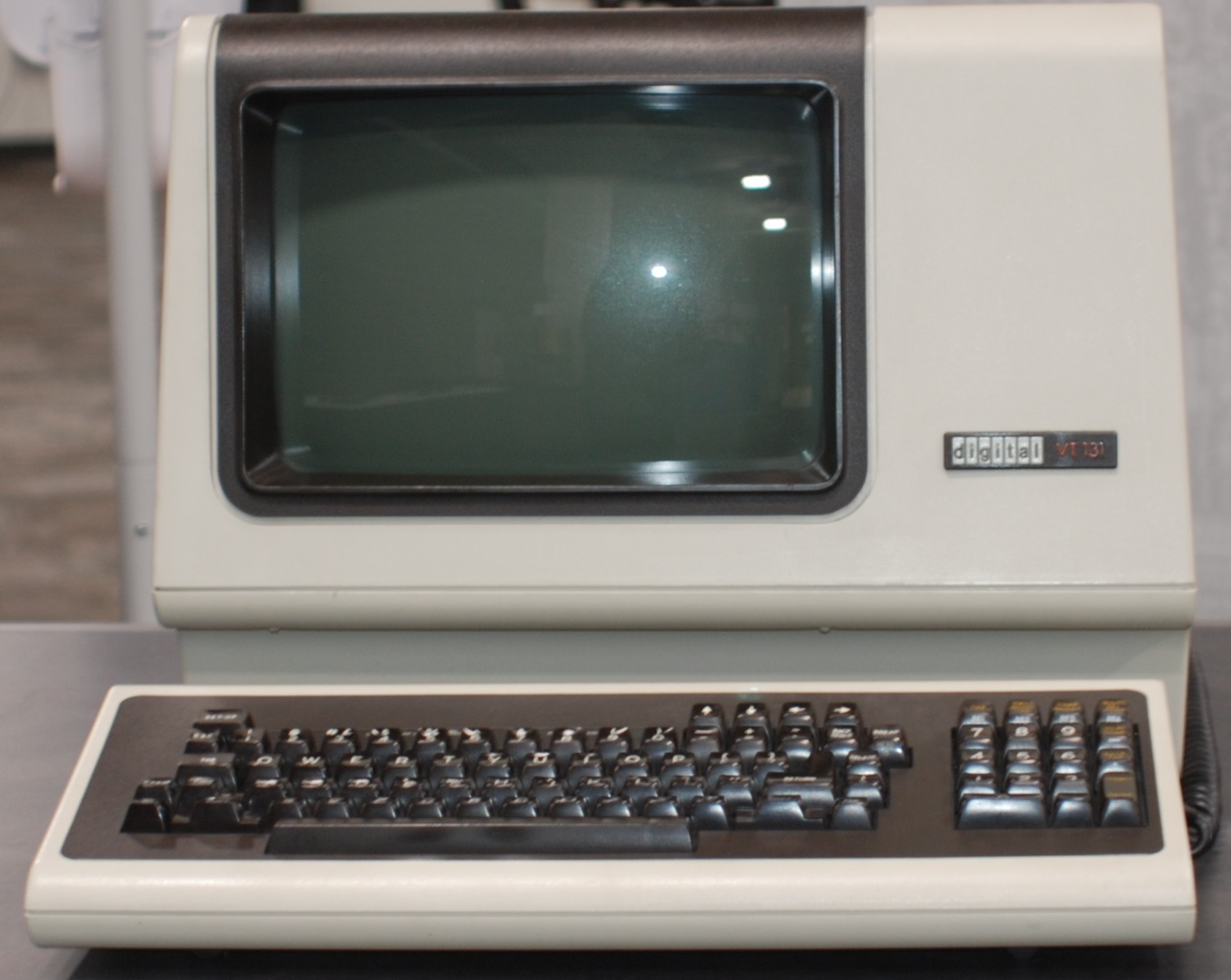
VT131 at the Living Computer Museum

The VT100 was the first of Digital's terminals to be based on an industry-standard microprocessor, the Intel 8080. Options could be added to the terminal to support an external printer, additional graphic renditions, and more character memory. The last option, known as the "Advanced Video Option" or AVO, allowed the terminal to support a full 24 lines of text in 132-column mode, increasing from the 14 lines of the unexpanded model when used in 132-column mode. The VT100 became a platform on which Digital constructed several related hardware products.

The VT101 and VT102 were cost-reduced, non-expandable follow-on versions. The VT101 was essentially a base-model VT100, while the VT102 came standard with the AVO and serial printer port options pre-installed. The VT105 contained a simple graphics subsystem known as waveform graphics which was mostly compatible with same system in the earlier VT55. This system allowed two mathematical functions to be drawn to the screen superimposed over the normal text display, allowing text and graphics to be mixed to produce charts and similar output. The VT125 added an implementation of the byte-efficient Remote Graphic Instruction Set (ReGIS), which used custom ANSI codes to send graphics commands to the terminal, rather than requiring the terminal to be set to a separate less-efficient graphics mode like the VT105.

The VT131 added block mode support, allowing a form to be sent to the terminal and filled in locally by the user, and then sending the contents of the fields in the form back to the host when the form is filled in.

The VT100 form factor left significant physical space in the case for expansion, and DEC used this to produce several all-in-one stand-alone minicomputer systems. The VT103 included a cardcage and 4×4 (8-slot) Q-Bus backplane, sufficient to configure a small 16-bit LSI-11 microcomputer system within the case, and supported an optional dual TU58 DECtape II block-addressable cartridge tape drive which could be used like a very slow disk drive. The VT180 (codenamed "Robin") added a single-board microcomputer using a Zilog Z80 to run the CP/M operating system. The VT278 (DECmate) added a small PDP-8 processor, allowing the terminal to run Digital's WPS-8 word processing software.

== See also ==
- DEC Special Graphics
- VT640
