= AlphaWindows =

Proposed industry standard for CRT screens

AlphaWindows was a proposed industry standard from the Display Industry Association (an industry consortium in California) in the early 1990s that would allow a single CRT screen to implement multiple windows, each of which was to behave as a distinct computer terminal. Individual vendors offered products based on this in 1992 through the end of the 1990s.

These products were targeted at a low-end market.

The initial concept relied on custom (but low-cost) terminals which would support mouse interaction, (text) windowing support, and colored text. With that, plus special host software, the vendors proposed to support semi-graphical applications "transparently".

== Organization ==
The Display Industry Association was at the same location as Cumulus Technology (the same street address in Palo Alto, CA). Cumulus was a manufacturer of displays since 1986. Cumulus was heavily involved with development of the AlphaWindows standard. The members of the association in 1993 were:

Terminal vendors

- AT&T / NCR / ADDS (partnership)
- Cumulus
- DEC
- Link / Wyse (partnership)
- Microvitec
- Siemens / Nixdorf (partnership)
- TeleVideo

Software vendors

- Cumulus
- JSB
- Nutec
- SSSI

Only Cumulus was proposing both to develop the terminals and the host software. However, Cumulus did not survive: it went bankrupt.

== Software ==
JSB Software Technologies produced MultiView Mascot. As noted in Unix Review:

MultiView Mascot helps users access graphical applications, such as Web sites and e-mail systems, from a character-based browser. It does so by mapping graphical applications to a multiwindowed character system. Although there is the inevitable loss of graphics and formatting, the result is surprisingly workable. A hot-key feature allows any old character terminal to offer switching between multiple applications at the same time, with no programming required.

As of 2007, the product is owned by FutureSoft.

SSSI (Structured Software Solutions, Inc.) produced the FacetTerm session multiplexer.

== See also ==
- X terminal
- Twin
