= Terminal emulator =

Program that emulates a video terminal

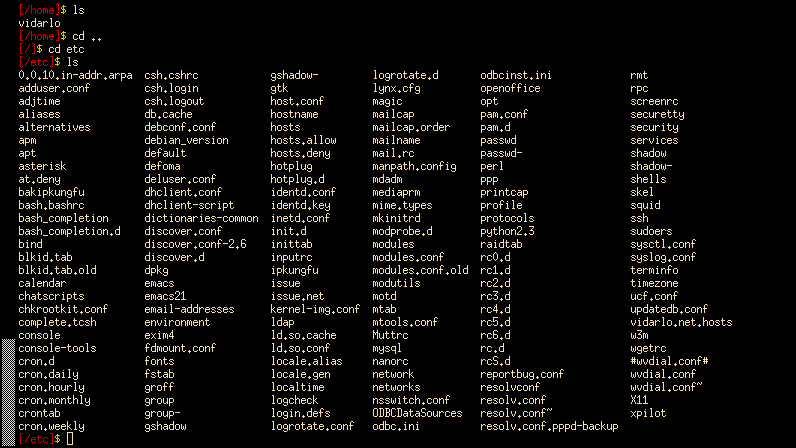
xterm, a terminal emulator designed for the X Window System

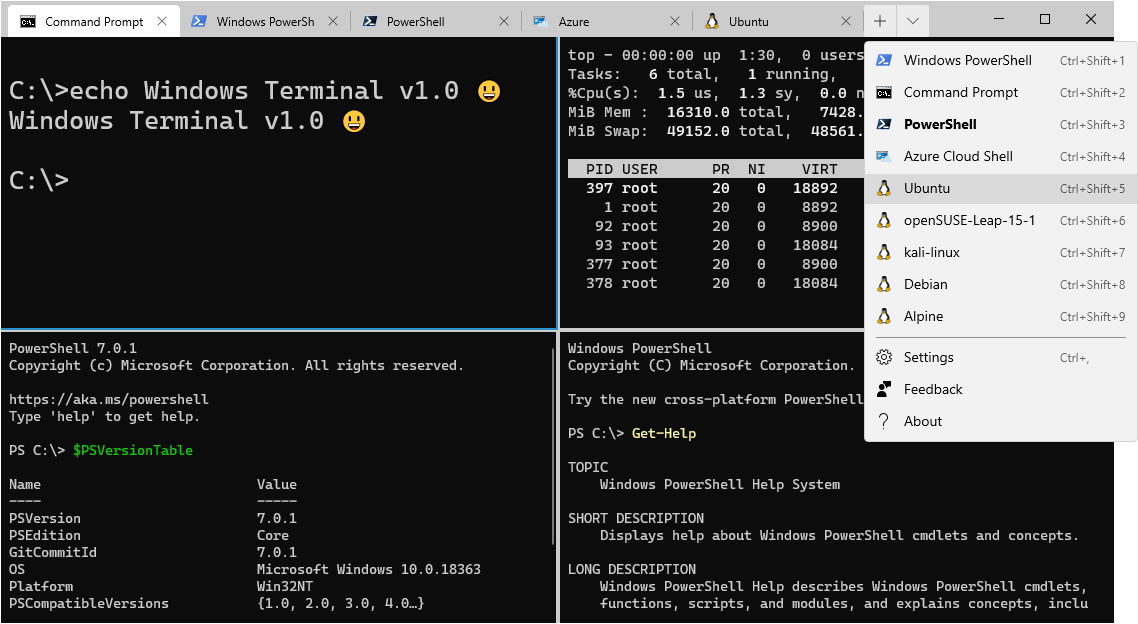
Windows Terminal, an open-source terminal emulator for Windows 10 and Windows 11

A terminal emulator, or terminal application, is a computer program that emulates a video terminal within another display architecture. Though typically synonymous with a shell or text terminal, the term terminal covers all remote terminals, including graphical interfaces. A terminal emulator inside a graphical user interface is often called a terminal window.

A terminal window allows the user access to a text terminal and all its applications such as command-line interfaces (CLI) and text user interface (TUI) applications. These may be running either on the same machine or on a different one via telnet, ssh, dial-up, or over a direct serial connection. On Unix-like operating systems, it is common to have one or more terminal windows connected to the local machine.

Terminals usually support a set of escape sequences for controlling color, cursor position, etc. Examples include the family of terminal control sequence standards that includes ECMA-48, ANSI X3.64, and ISO/IEC 6429.

== Background ==
In the early days of computing, with the advent of interactive computing, the prevailing model involved a central computer connected to multiple terminals. This configuration, known as the centralized or mainframe model, featured a powerful central computer that performed all the processing tasks, while terminals served as input/output devices for users to interact with the system. These systems were initially character based.

=== Character-oriented terminals ===
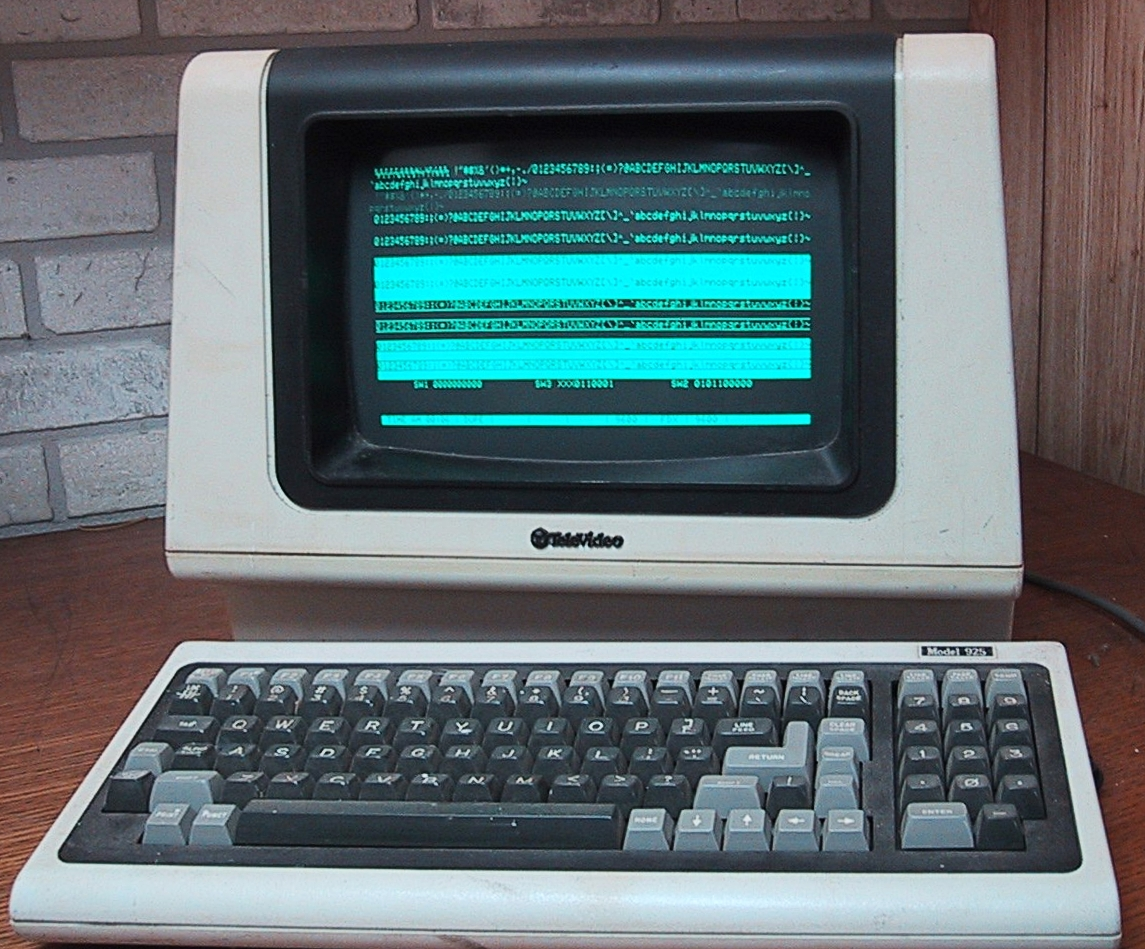
A Televideo ASCII character mode terminal

A character-oriented terminal is a type of computer terminal that communicates with its host one character at a time, as opposed to a block-oriented terminal that communicates in blocks of data. It is the most common type of data terminal, because it is easy to implement and program. Connection to the mainframe computer or terminal server is achieved via RS-232 serial links, Ethernet or other proprietary protocols.

Character-oriented terminals can be "dumb" or "smart". Dumb terminals are those that can interpret a limited number of control codes (CR, LF, etc.) but do not have the ability to process special escape sequences that perform functions such as clearing a line, clearing the screen, or controlling cursor position. In this context dumb terminals are sometimes dubbed glass Teletypes, for they essentially have the same limited functionality as does a mechanical Teletype. This type of dumb terminal is still supported on modern Unix-like systems by setting the environment variable TERM to dumb. Smart or intelligent terminals are those that also have the ability to process escape sequences, in particular the VT52, VT100 or ANSI escape sequences.

== Emulators ==
When personal computers became ubiquitous in the 1980s, they offered the option of running software on the user's personal computer, providing an opportunity to replace the expensive and space consuming hardware terminals with something that had additional functions. Immediately software became available, that could emulate the functions of the hardware terminals on a PC. Examples of such software for DOS were Telix or Telemate, which was published in 1988 and could emulate a DEC VT102 terminal.

Workstations, usually running versions of Unix, also became common in the 1980s. Unix systems usually provided access to the command line with locally-attached or dial-up terminals. Unix workstations were designed to be used primarily through a graphical user interface (GUI); to provide access to the command line, the GUI included terminal emulator applications that behaved like locally-attached terminals.

During the 1990s, new operating systems like Windows and OS/2 arrived, providing the technical background for more terminal emulators such as Telix for Windows, ZOC for OS/2, or PuTTY, which was initially released for Windows in 1998 and which (together with its derivates) remains a very popular choice to this day.

Through the success of Linux on servers, especially running on data centers and cloud servers, the necessity of accessing remote computers through character-based terminal emulators remains.

== Examples of terminals emulated ==
Many terminal emulators have been developed for physical hardware terminals such as VT52, VT100, VT220, VT320, IBM 3270/8/9/E, IBM 5250, IBM 3179G, Data General D211, Hewlett-Packard HP700/92, Sperry/Unisys 2000-series UTS60, Burroughs/Unisys A-series T27/TD830/ET1100, ADDS ViewPoint, AT386, Siemens Nixdorf (SNI) 97801, Televideo 925, and Wyse 50/60.

Some terminal emulators, such as xterm, implement additional features not present in the emulated terminal.

Additionally, programs have been developed to emulate assorted system console "terminals" such as the Sun workstation console and the Linux console.

Finally, some emulators simply refer to a set of standards, such as the standards for ANSI escape codes.

Such programs are available on many platforms, including DOS, Unix-like systems including Linux and macOS, Windows, and embedded operating systems found in cellphones and industrial hardware.

== Implementation details ==
=== Unix-like systems ===
In the past, Unix and Unix-like systems used serial port devices such as RS-232 ports, and provided /dev/* device files for them.

With terminal emulators these device files are themselves emulated by a pair of pseudoterminal devices. These in turn emulate a physical port/connection to the host computing endpoint – hardware provided by operating system APIs, or software such as rlogin, telnet or SSH, among others. In Linux systems, for example, these would be /dev/ptyp0 (for the master side) and /dev/ttyp0 (for the slave side) pseudoterminal devices respectively.

There are also special virtual console files like /dev/console. In text mode, writing to the file displays text on the virtual console and reading from the file returns text the user writes to the virtual console. As with other text terminals, there are also special escape sequences, control characters and functions that a program can use, most easily via a library such as ncurses. For more complex operations, the programs can use console and terminal special ioctl system calls. One can compare devices using the patterns vcs ("virtual console screen") and vcsa ("virtual console screen with attributes") such as /dev/vcs1 and /dev/vcsa1.

Some terminal emulators also include escape sequences for configuring the behavior of the terminal to facilitate good interoperation between the terminal and programs running inside of it, for example to configure paste bracketing.

The virtual consoles can be configured in the file /etc/inittab read by init—typically it starts the text mode login process getty for several virtual consoles. X Window System can be configured in /etc/inittab or by an X display manager. A number of Linux distributions use systemd instead of init, which also allows virtual console configuration.

==== CLI tools ====
Typical Linux system programs used to access the virtual consoles include:

- chvt to switch the current virtual console
- openvt to run a program on a new virtual console
- deallocvt to close a currently unused virtual console

=== Local echo ===
Terminal emulators may implement a local echo function, which may erroneously be named "half-duplex", or still slightly incorrectly "echoplex" (which is formally an error detection mechanism rather than an input display option).

=== Line-at-a-time mode/Local editing ===
Terminal emulators may implement local editing, also known as "line-at-a-time mode". This is also mistakenly referred to as "half-duplex". In this mode, the terminal emulator only sends complete lines of input to the host system. The user enters and edits a line, but it is held locally within the terminal emulator as it is being edited. It is not transmitted until the user signals its completion, usually with the ↵ Enter key on the keyboard or a "send" button of some sort in the user interface. At that point, the entire line is transmitted. Line-at-a-time mode implies local echo, since otherwise the user will not be able to see the line as it is being edited and constructed. However, line-at-a-time mode is independent of echo mode and does not require local echo. When entering a password, for example, line-at-a-time entry with local editing is possible, but local echo is turned off (otherwise the password would be displayed).

The complexities of line-at-a-time mode are exemplified by the line-at-a-time mode option in the telnet protocol. To implement it correctly, the Network Virtual Terminal implementation provided by the terminal emulator program must be capable of recognizing and properly dealing with "interrupt" and "abort" events that arrive in the middle of locally editing a line.

=== Synchronous terminals ===
In asynchronous terminals data can flow in any direction at any time. In synchronous terminals a protocol controls who may send data when. IBM 3270-based terminals used with IBM mainframe computers are an example of synchronous terminals. They operate in an essentially "screen-at-a-time" mode (also known as block mode). Users can make numerous changes to a page, before submitting the updated screen to the remote machine as a single action.

Terminal emulators that simulate the 3270 protocol are available for most operating systems, for use both by those administering systems such as the z9, as well as those using the corresponding applications such as CICS.

Other examples of synchronous terminals include the IBM 5250, ICL 7561, Honeywell Bull VIP7800 and Hewlett-Packard 700/92.

=== Virtual consoles ===
Virtual consoles, also called virtual terminals, are emulated text terminals, using the keyboard and monitor of a personal computer or workstation. The word "text" is key since virtual consoles are not GUI terminals and they do not run inside a graphical interface. Virtual consoles are found on most Unix-like systems. They are primarily used to access and interact with servers, without using a graphical desktop environment.

== See also ==
- Binary Synchronous Communications
- List of terminal emulators
- Online service provider
- Serial interface
- Terminal multiplexer
