= TeleVideo =

U.S. computer hardware manufacturer (1975-2011)

TeleVideo Corporation
- Type: Corporation
- Industry: Computer hardware
- Founded: 1975; 51 years ago
- Founder: K. Philip Hwang
- Fate: Chapter 11 bankruptcy in 2006; disestablished in 2011
- Headquarters: San Jose, California, United States
- Products: Terminals, Graphic boards for Terminals, TeleVideo TS-800, TS-802, TS-803, TS-804, TeleVideo TS-1603, TeleVideo TPC-1, TeleVideo TS-806, TS-816
- Website: televideo.com at the Wayback Machine (archived 2005-03-06)

TeleVideo Corporation was a U.S. company that achieved its peak of success in the early 1980s producing computer terminals. TeleVideo was founded in 1975 by K. Philip Hwang, a Utah State University, Hanyang University graduate born in North Korea who closed a successful 7-Eleven franchise he and his wife had run, and invested $9000 in savings in the new company. Hwang had run a business producing CRT monitors for arcade games since 1975. The company was headquartered in San Jose, California.

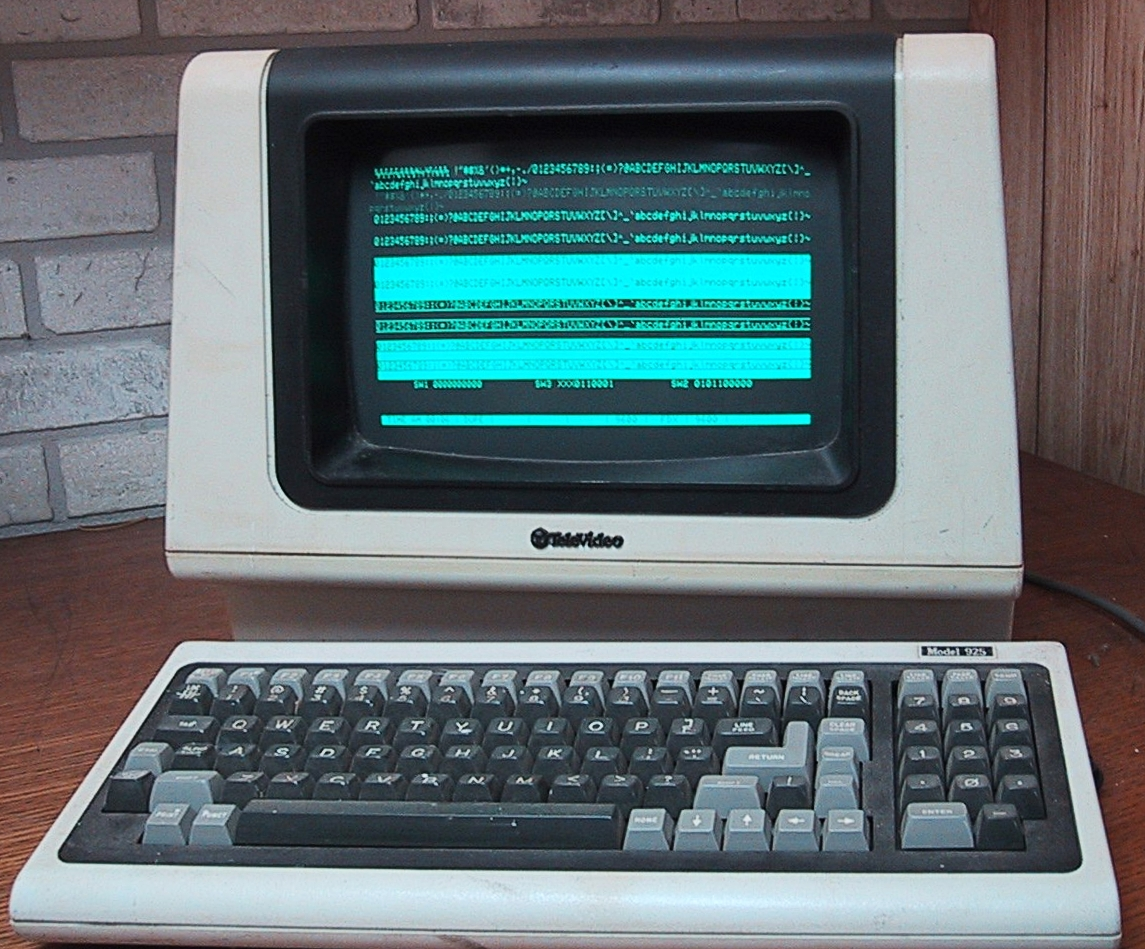
A TeleVideo terminal model 925 made around 1982

TeleVideo's terminal protocol was popular in the early days of microcomputers and was widely supported by applications as well as terminal emulators (often referred to as "TeleVideo 925 emulation").

TeleVideo also built CP/M-compatible 8-bit desktop and portable personal computers based on the Z80 processor. Up to sixteen of these machines could be connected to proprietary multi-user systems through serial interfaces. After 1982 sales of $98.5 million, the company had an initial public offering in March 1983, valuing Hwang's shares in the company at $500 million. In April 1983, TeleVideo introduced an MS-DOS 2.0-compatible personal computer based on the Intel 8088. This was introduced as the Model TS-1603 and included 128 KB RAM (expandable up to 256 KB), integrated monitor, modem and keyboard. The Model TS-1603 ran both TeleVideo PC DOS 2.0 and CP/M-86 1.1.

The company later turned to manufacturing Windows-compatible thin client computers, but eventually sold this business line to Neoware in October 2005. The latter was subsequently taken over by Hewlett-Packard in 2007.

On March 14, 2006, TeleVideo, Inc. filed a voluntary petition for reorganization under Chapter 11 of the United States Bankruptcy Code. The company filed for Chapter 11 bankruptcy once more in June 2008.

After more than 35 years in business and with millions of terminals sold worldwide, TeleVideo discontinued the manufacturing and sales of all terminal products as of September 30, 2011.

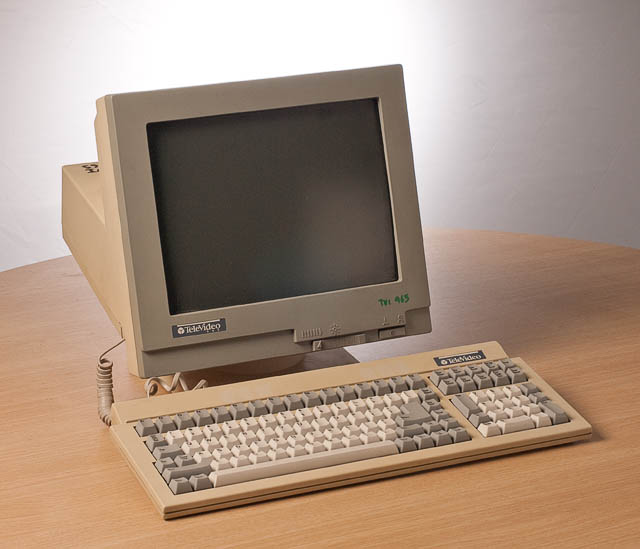
A TeleVideo 965 terminal

== Products ==
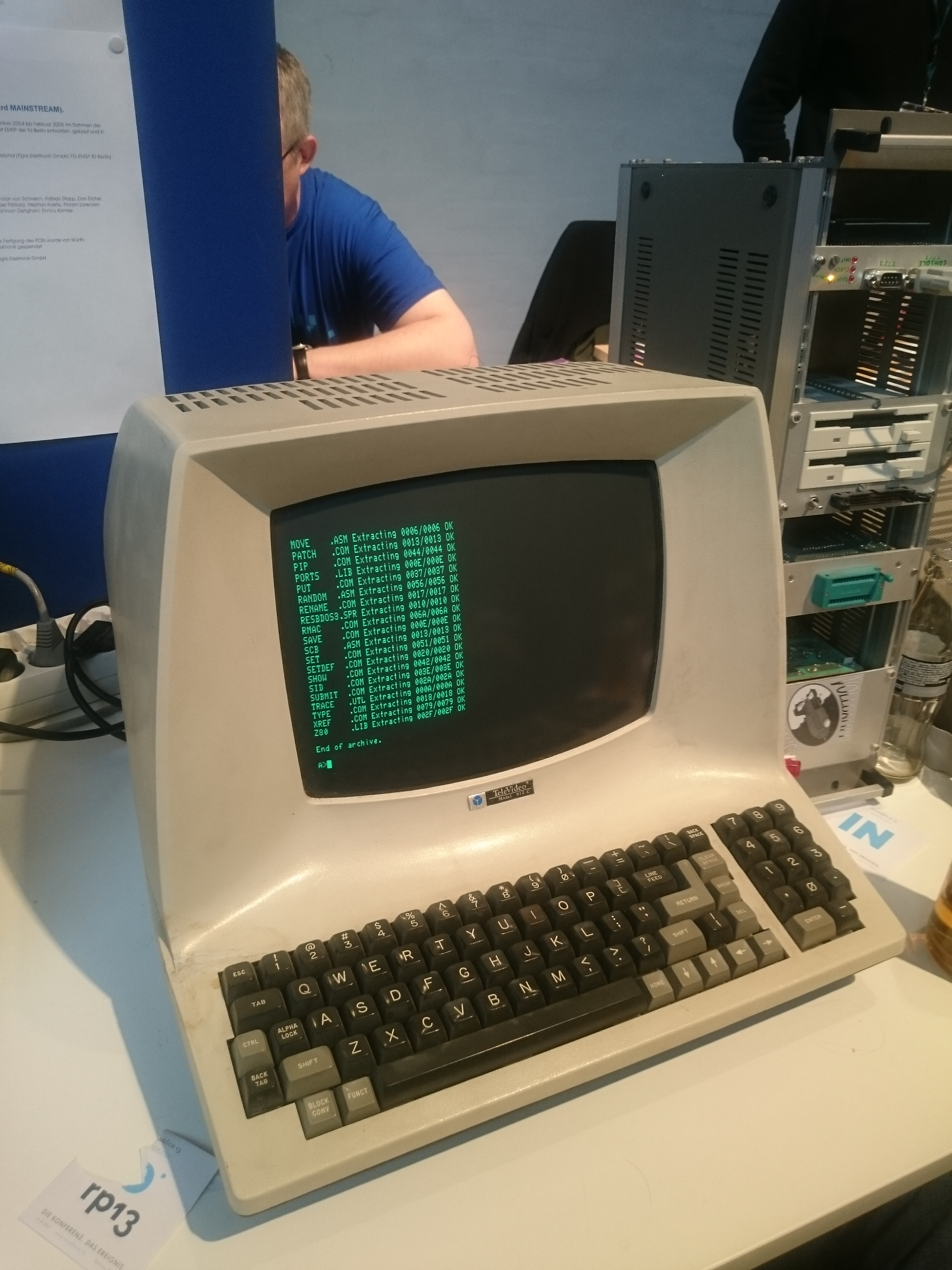
Televideo 912C

- Terminals: TeleVideo 905, 910, 912, 914, 920, 921, 922, 924, 925, 9320, 935, 950, 955, 965, 970, 990, 995–65, Personal Terminal
- Graphic boards for Terminals: 914GR, 924GR, 970GR
- CP/M systems: TeleVideo TS-800, TS-802, TS-803
- CP/M Plus and MP/M II: TeleVideo TS-804 (4 users for MP/M II)
- CP/M-86/MS-DOS systems: TeleVideo TS-1603
- TeleVideo TPC-1, a portable CP/M system similar to the Osborne-1
- Early multi-user systems: TeleVideo TS-806 (6 users), TS-816 (16 users)
- 80286 IBM AT clone TELECAT 286, a small green desktop IBM AT clone with a 6 or 8 MHz 80286 CPU Trademark filing for TELECAT-286 1986

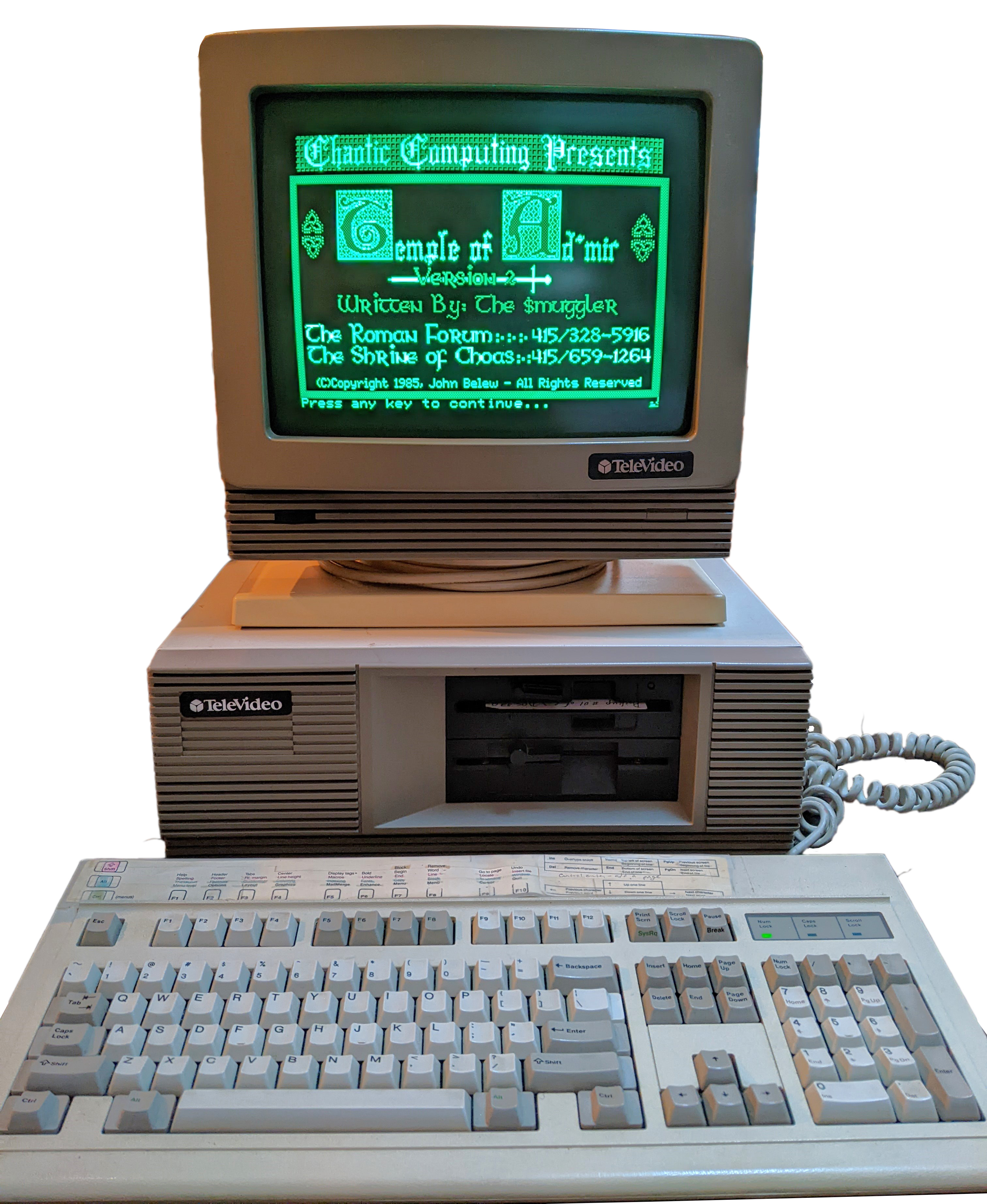
Televideo TeleCAT-286 computer
