= Telix =

Telecommunications program

- DOS Telix 3.22
- Original author(s): Colin Sampaleanu
- Developer(s): Colin Sampaleanu; Exis Inc. deltaComm Development Inc.
- Initial release: 1986; 39 years ago (DOS); 1994; 31 years ago (Windows)
- Final release: 3.51 (DOS); v1.15d (Windows) / May 22, 1996; 28 years ago (DOS); August 6, 1996; 28 years ago (Windows)
- Written in: C (DOS); Turbo Pascal (Windows)
- Operating system: DOS; Microsoft Windows
- Type: Terminal emulator
- License: Shareware (DOS); Proprietary commercial software (Windows)
- Website: web.archive.org/web/20120721234948/http://www.telix.com/index.html

Telix is a telecommunications program originally written for DOS by Colin Sampaleanu and released in 1986. On October 10, 1988 in the release note for Telix 3.10, Sampaleanu announced the creation of 'Exis Inc.'; name used to develop the software until September 25, 1992; which is when Exis Inc. sold Telix to former Exis Technical Support Manager Jeff Woods, who founded 'deltaComm Development Inc.' and it was distributed by them thereafter, including the Microsoft Windows version they developed and released in 1994.

The DOS version was shareware and had great popularity in the early 1990s. Its strengths included a fast built-in version of the Zmodem file transfer protocol, rather than needing a separate program, and a powerful scripting programming language similar to C, 'SALT' (Script Application Language for Telix), as well as a simpler scripting language called 'SIMPLE' which was suitable for most scripting tasks.

The Windows version suffered from a variety of problems, including delays in publication (it was a complete rewrite by a new author, in Turbo Pascal for Windows, rather than the original C), an unpopular attempt at copy protection and the World Wide Web's impact on bulletin board systems.

Telix can be used to dial bulletin board systems or other phone-line based services. It supports ANSI emulation and various file transfer protocols.

== See also ==
- Category:Communication software
