= Uniscope =

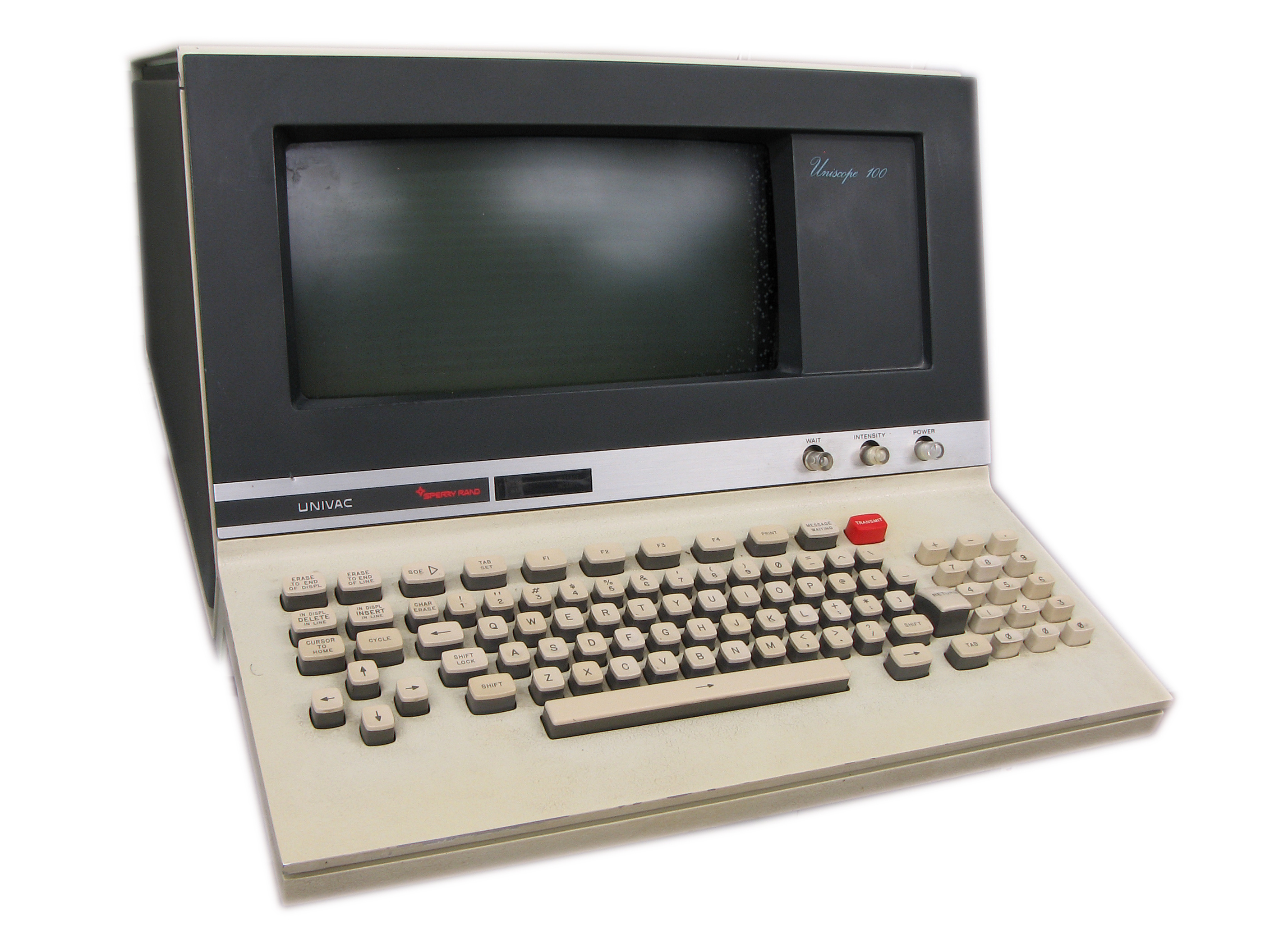
Sperry Rand UNIVAC Uniscope 100 data terminal.

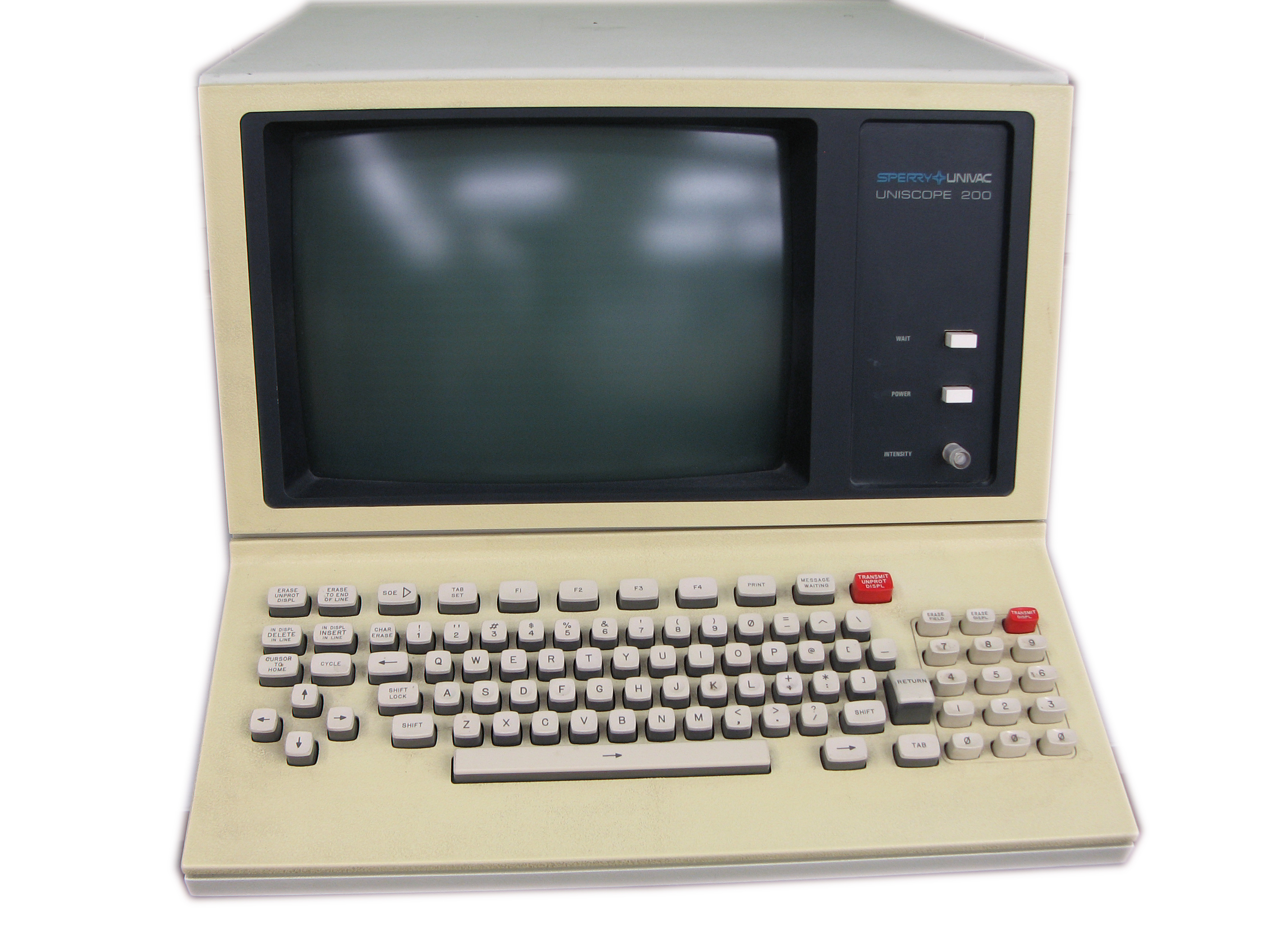
Sperry-UNIVAC UNISCOPE 200 data terminal.

Uniscope was a class of computer terminals made by Sperry Rand Corporation, Univac Division, and successors since 1964 that were normally used to communicate with Univac mainframes. As such, it was the successor to various models of Teletype. Due to the text color on the original models, these terminals are informally known as green screen terminals.

Unlike Teletype terminals, the Uniscope minimizes the number of I/O interrupts required by accepting large blocks of data, and uses a high speed proprietary communications interface, using coaxial cable and hardware devices known as multiplexors. A Uniscope operator awaits a prompt from the remote mainframe. The prompt indicates that the mainframe is ready to receive input. The operator enters data, offline from the mainframe, and then presses the Transmit button. The terminal locks the keyboard and sends to the mainframe what the operator entered. All the data goes in a single transmission and that causes a single interrupt at the mainframe. Eventually, the mainframe responds, sometimes with a single line; other times with a screen-load of data. And the cycle repeats.

== Models ==
Uniscope was a registered trade mark for a set of Sperry Univac dumb terminal products. The trademark was applied for October 13, 1969. Several models were produced: the Uniscope 100, Uniscope 200, Uniscope 300, the UTS 400, the UTS 10, the UTS 20, the UTS 30, the UTS 40 and the color UTS 60. The UTS 10, UTS 20, UTS 30, UTS 40 and the color UTS 60 were "intelligent terminals" powered by 8-bit microprocessors. There was also the UTS 4000 cluster controller and terminal line, and the SVT-1120. Various models supported 16x64, 12x80, and 24x80 display formats. The UTS 4000 line had a COBOL compiler available that made it possible to do local processing in the cluster controller, and the UTS 60 was also capable of being programmed. This line of terminals roughly paralleled the similar IBM product, the IBM 3270. The UTS-400-TE was specialized terminal that had a powerful text editing program burned into firmware intended at first to allow for the editing of simple copy such as that for a newspaper, and later adapted as a prototype word processor with 8-inch floppy disks and letter-quality daisy wheel printers.

== Technical details ==
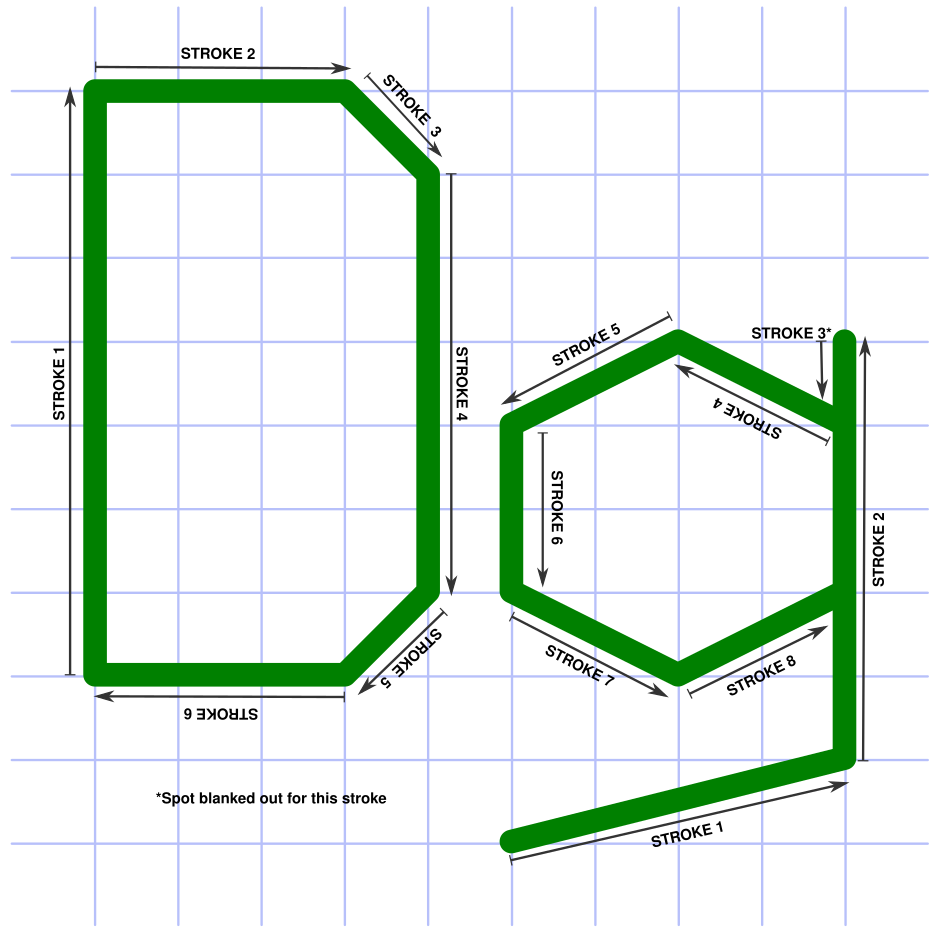
Characters on the Uniscope 100 were generated as "strokes" on the [[CRT]] instead of a bitmap.

All members of the Uniscope product line used a variant of the Binary Synchronous Communications protocol. Groups of terminals were generally dropped off a common communications line via a multiplexer (mux) and identified by remote identifier and station identifier symbols. Some terminals may have been equipped with peripheral devices such as printers and recording devices (cartridge tape or floppy disk) which were identified on the communications line by a device identifier. Terminals on a drop were sequentially polled for traffic, sometimes with a general poll to which any terminal with traffic could respond. A fairly complex data presentation protocol permitted application programmers to format a screen for any number of business purposes. For example, fields could be defined that would accept only numeric or alpha-numeric characters. Some fields could not be changed by the terminal operator. A protocol extension permitted programmers to specify color for each field and lines on the borders of each cell (underline, or vertical bars, etc.) The Uniscope display protocol, while proprietary, roughly parallel the ANSI X3.64 standard ("additional controls for use with American national standard code for information interchange").

Screen size of the original Uniscope 100 was 12 X 80 or 16 x 64 characters. All letters were in capital. Each character was individually drawn as a series of splines using technology developed for displays in military cockpits. Later Uniscopes supported a 24 X 80 screen using raster technology, and upper and lower case characters. There were versions that had the various national code sets for different European countries to enable pound signs, and various accented characters, etc. There were also versions that had Katakana code sets for Japanese.

== UTS 60 ==
The color UTS 60 terminal using two Motorola processors arrived on the market in 1984 at about the same time as desktop computers with EGA monitors. The general consensus was that the UTS 60 was over-engineered and overpriced for the emerging market. Eventually emulation software for the Uniscope line running on desktop computers ended manufacturing of Uniscope hardware.

== Emulators ==
Unisys developed the INFOConnect terminal emulators for PCs that included use of the Uniscope protocols in the early 1990s. There continue to be vendors that sell terminal emulators for these machines.

== See also ==
- List of UNIVAC products
- History of computing hardware
